= List of tallest buildings in Nebraska =

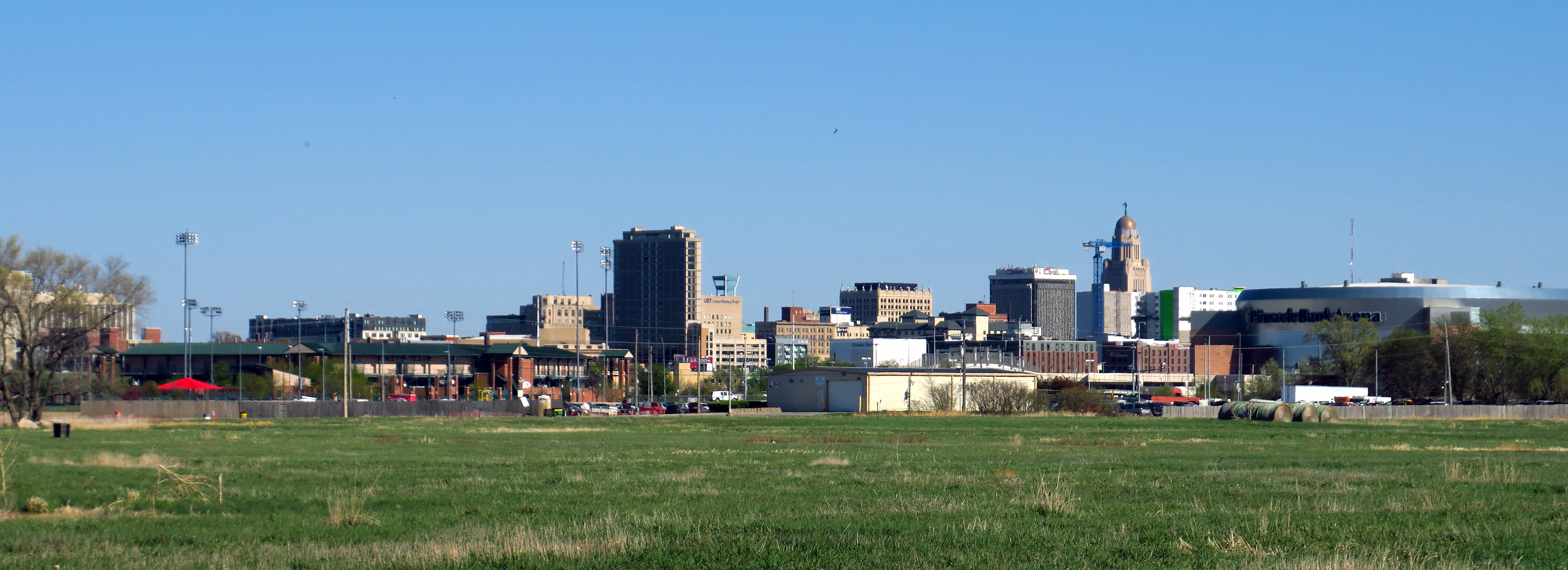
Skyline of Lincoln

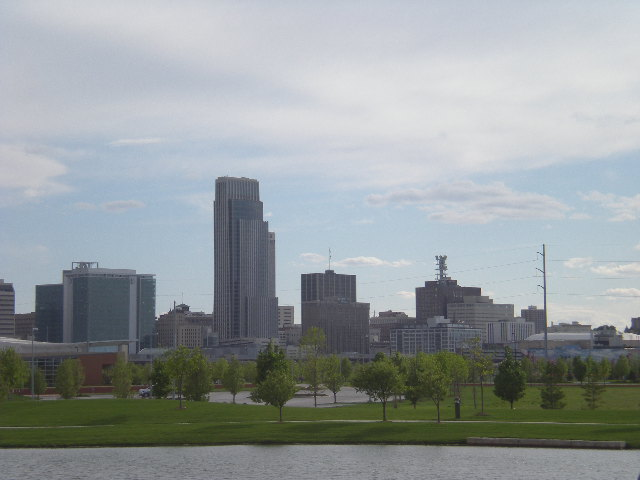
Skyline of Omaha

This list of tallest buildings in Nebraska ranks skyscrapers in the U.S. state of Nebraska by height for existing and proposed structures. This list includes buildings with a minimum height of 200 feet (61 meters), and features the 23 tallest completed buildings in the state, 20 of which are located in Omaha.

Nebraska's tallest building is the 677-foot (206 m), 44-story Mutual of Omaha Headquarters Tower. Completed in 2026, it stands as both the tallest building in the City of Omaha and the State of Nebraska. The 634 foot (193 m) tall First National Bank Tower held the title from 2002 to 2026. The 478-foot (146 m), 30-story tall Woodmen Tower was formerly the tallest; and before that, the 15-story tall Nebraska State Capitol.

== Tallest buildings ==
Rank	Name	Image	Height ft (m)	Floors	Year	City	Notes
1	Mutual of Omaha Headquarters Tower		677 feet (206 m)	44	2026	Omaha	Office
2	First National Bank Tower	One First National Center, since 2002 the tallest building in Omaha and Nebraska	634 (193)	45	2002	Omaha	Office
3	WoodmenLife Tower	Woodmen Tower from 1969 until 2002 the tallest building in Omaha	478 (146)	30	1969	Omaha	Office
4	Nebraska State Capitol	Nebraska State Capitol, since 1932 the tallest building in Lincoln	400 (120)	15	1932	Lincoln	Government
5	AT&T Building	AT&T Building, from 1919 until 1963 the tallest building in Omaha	334 (102)	16	1919	Omaha	Office
6	Elmwood Tower		320 (98), disputed	23	1963	Omaha	Residential
7	Union Pacific Center	Union Pacific Center	317 (97)	19	2004	Omaha	Office
8	First National Center	The First National Center	295 (90)	25	1971	Omaha	Office
9	Mutual of Omaha Building		285 (87)	14	1970	Omaha	Office
10	Northern Natural Gas Building	The Northern Natural Gas Building in downtown Omaha	260 (79)	15	1957	Omaha	Residential
11	Lied Place Residences	The Lied Place Residences	257 (78)	20	2022	Lincoln	Residential
12	1200 Landmark Center	The 1200 Landmark Center in downtown Omaha	255 (78)	15	1990	Omaha	Office
13	Omaha World-Herald	The Omaha World Herald Building	250 (76)	16	1980	Omaha	Office
14	Omaha Double Tree Hotel	The Omaha Double Tree Hotel.	239 (73)	19	1970	Omaha	Hotel
15	Lied Transplant Center	The Lied Transplant Center on the UNMC campus.	230 (70)	15	1999	Omaha	Hospital(primarily)
16T	Orpheum Tower	Omaha's City National Bank Building, now known as The Orpheum Tower	220 (67)	16	1910	Omaha	Residential
16T	U.S. Bank Tower	|	220 (67)	18	1970	Lincoln	Office
17	Central Park Plaza I	South Tower of Central Park Plaza	213 (65)	16	1982	Omaha	Office
17	Central Park Plaza II	South Tower of Central Park Plaza	213 (65)	16	1982	Omaha	Office
18	Blackstone Plaza	Kiewit Plaza	212 feet (65)	14	1961	Omaha	Office
18	Farnam 1600	Kiewit Plaza	212 (65)	14	1917	Omaha	Residential
19	Westbrook Tower		206 (63)	17	1966	Omaha	Residential
20	RiverFront Place Condos II	River Front Place from the Bob Kerrey Pedestrian Bridge	202 (62)	15	2011	Omaha	Residential
21	Omaha Tower		200 (61)	15	1976	Omaha	Office

== Tallest buildings: site prep or under construction ==
Picture	Name	Height	Floors	Year	Status	City	Area	Use	Notes
	Project Health	380 feet (120 m) to 400 feet (122 m)	18-20	2030	Under construction	Omaha	Midtown	Medical	Will function as a clinical learning and research center, as well as patient hospital, for Nebraska Medicine and UNMC. The $2.19 billion tower will be 50% funded by private dollars.

== Approved or proposed ==
Name	Height	Floors	Status	Status year	City	Area	Use	Notes
Mixed-use Development	260 feet (79 m)	20	Proposed	2020	Omaha	Westroads	Mixed-use	20,000 sq ft of office, 35,000 sq ft of retail space, a skyline restaurant, a 104,000 sq ft hotel, and 120,000 sq ft of luxury condos.
The Beam	200 feet (61 m)	17	Approved	2024	Omaha	Downtown	Residential	Mass timber tower consisting of 5 floors of parking and 12 floors of residential.
9 Lincoln Park	254 feet (77 m)	22	On hold	2024	Lincoln	Haymarket	Mixed-use	
South Gold's Tower	260 feet (79 m)	23	Proposed	2025	Lincoln	Downtown	Mixed-use	

== Cancelled ==
Name	Height	City	Floors	Use	Notes
Vortex Tower	610 feet (186 m)	Omaha	60	Observation Tower	
Lanoha Tower	430 feet (131 m)	Omaha	30	Office/Retail	
Omaha Marriott Hotel	377 feet (115 m)	Omaha	28	Hotel	
WallStreet Tower	373 feet (114 m)	Omaha	32	Residential	
Project 19	320 feet (98 m)	Omaha	20	Office	
HDR, Inc. Corporate Headquarters	265 feet (81 m)	Omaha	16	Office	

== Timeline of tallest buildings ==
The following is a list of buildings that were once the tallest structure in Nebraska.

Name	City	Years as tallest	Height feet / m	Floors	Reference
Omaha National Bank Building	Omaha	1889–1912	180 feet (55 m)	10	
Woodmen of the World Building	Omaha	1912–1919	245 feet (75 m)	19	
AT&T Building (Omaha)	Omaha	1919–1932	265 feet (81 m)	16	
Nebraska State Capitol	Lincoln	1932–1969	400 feet (120 m)	22	
Woodmen Tower	Omaha	1969–2002	478 feet (146 m)	30	
First National Bank Tower	Omaha	2002–present	634 feet (193 m)	45	

== See also ==
- List of tallest buildings in Omaha, Nebraska
- Mutual of Omaha Headquarters Tower
