= List of tallest buildings in Omaha =

Skyline of Omaha
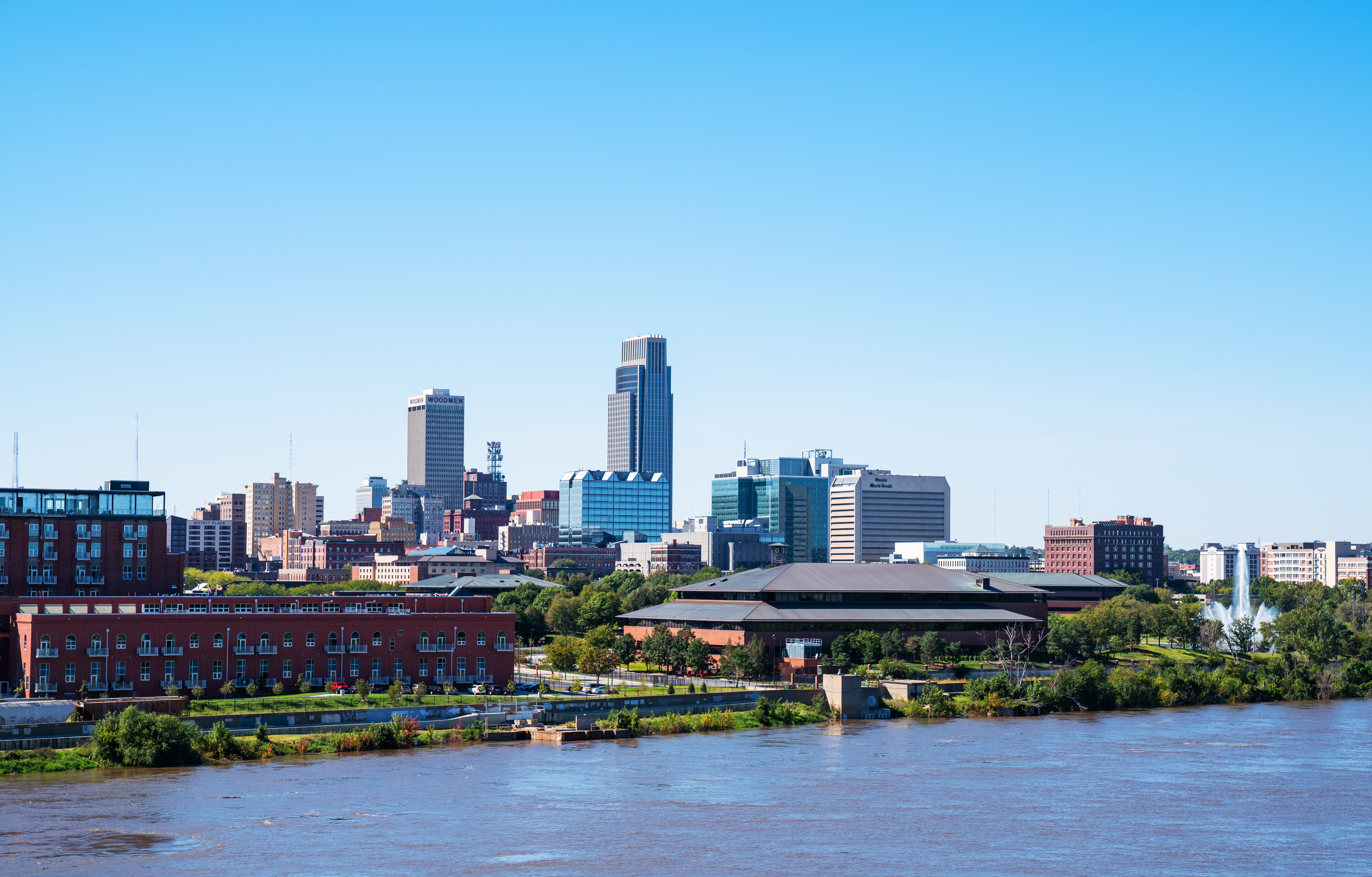
- City of Omaha, Nebraska Skyline on the Missouri River
- Tallest building: Mutual of Omaha Tower (2026)
- Tallest building height: 677 ft (206 m)
- Major clusters: Downtown; Midtown

Number of tall buildings (2025)
- Taller than 100 m (328 ft): 4
- Taller than 150 m (492 ft): 2
- Taller than 200 m (656 ft): 1

Number of tall buildings — feet
- Taller than 200 ft (61.0 m): 22
- Taller than 300 ft (91.4 m): 6

As of 2025, Omaha, Nebraska, has 21 buildings that stand above 200 feet (61 meters). These include the 45-story First National Bank Tower, the 30-story Woodmen Tower, and the 21-story Elmwood Tower. The 677-foot (206 m) Mutual of Omaha Headquarters Tower topped out in November 2025, and will become the tallest building in the city and state when it is completed in late 2026. Furthermore, Nebraska Medicine proposed a 20-story tower in 2024 that is set to become Omaha's tallest building in Midtown at over 400 feet (120 m). Site prep is currently underway.

Omaha's history of tall building construction can be divided into distinct periods, with the early skyscraper boom occurring in the 1910s. The City National Bank Building (completed in 1910) and the AT&T Building (completed in 1919) were among the city's first high-rises. The AT&T Building held the title of the city's tallest structure for half a century, from 1919 until 1969. The mid-century saw the development of Modernist towers, including the Woodmen Tower in 1969, which then held the record for the tallest building in Nebraska until the completion of the Postmodern First National Bank Tower in 2002.

== History ==
Number of high-rise buildings by height in Omaha by the end of each year, based on the list below. Click on the legend to toggle a specific height on or off. View chart definition.

== Map of tallest buildings ==
The following map shows the distribution of buildings taller than 200 ft (61 m) in the Omaha metropolitan area. Individual buildings are colored by their decade of completion and numbered by their height rank. Named clusters of three or more buildings are shown in further detail below.

Buildings taller than 200 ft (91 m) in the Omaha metropolitan area.
- 1950s and before
- 1960s
- 1970s
- 1980s
- 1990s
- 2000s
- 2010s
- 2020s
1 Mutual of Omaha Tower
2 First National Bank Tower
3 WoodmenLife Tower
4 AT&T Building
5 Elmwood Tower
6 Union Pacific Center
7 First National Center
8 Mutual of Omaha Building
9 The Highline
10 1200 Landmark Center
11 Omaha World-Herald
12 Omaha Double Tree Hotel
13 Lied Transplant Center
14 Charles Schwab Tower
15 Orpheum Tower
16 Central Park Plaza I
17 Central Park Plaza II
18 Farnam 1600
19 Blackstone Plaza
20 Westbrook Tower
21 RiverFront Place Condos II
22 Omaha Tower

=== By cluster ===
Downtown
Buildings taller than 200 ft (61 m)
- 1950s and before
- 1960s
- 1970s
- 1980s
- 1990s
- 2000s
- 2010s
- 2020s
1 Mutual of Omaha Tower
2 First National Bank Tower
3 WoodmenLife Tower
4 AT&T Building
6 Union Pacific Center
7 First National Center
9 The Highline
10 1200 Landmark Center
11 Omaha World-Herald
12 Omaha Double Tree Hotel
15 Orpheum Tower
16 Central Park Plaza I
17 Central Park Plaza II
18 Farnam 1600
20 Westbrook Tower
21 RiverFront Place Condos II

Midtown
Buildings taller than 200 ft (61 m)
- 1950s and before
- 1960s
- 1970s
- 1980s
- 1990s
- 2000s
- 2010s
- 2020s
5 Elmwood Tower
8 Mutual of Omaha Building
13 Lied Transplant Center
19 Blackstone Plaza

== Tallest habitable buildings ==
This list ranks completed and topped out high-rises in the Omaha metropolitan area that stand at least 200 feet (61 m) tall, based on standard height measurement. This includes spires and architectural details but does not include antenna masts. Buildings tied in height are sorted by year of completion and then alphabetically.

Was the tallest building in Omaha upon completion

Rank	Name	Picture	Floors	Height	Year Completed	Area	Primary Purpose	Source
1	Mutual of Omaha Tower		44	677 feet (206 m)	2026	Downtown	Office	
2	First National Bank Tower		45	634 feet (193 m)	2002	Downtown	Office	
3	WoodmenLife Tower		30	478 feet (146 m)	1969	Downtown	Office	
4	AT&T Building		16	334 feet (102 m)	1918	Downtown	Office	
5	Elmwood Tower		21	320 feet (98 m)	1963	Midtown	Residential	
6	Union Pacific Center		19	317 feet (97 m)	2004	Downtown	Office	
7	First National Center		22	295 feet (90 m)	1971	Downtown	Office	
8	Mutual of Omaha Building		14	285 feet (87 m)	1970	Midtown	Office	
9	The Highline		15	260 feet (79 m)	1957	Downtown	Residential	
10	1200 Landmark Center		15	255 feet (78 m)	1990	Downtown	Office	
11	Omaha World-Herald		16	250 feet (76 m)	1980	Downtown	Office	
12	Omaha Double Tree Hotel		19	239 feet (73 m)	1970	Downtown	Hotel	
13	Lied Transplant Center		15	230 feet (70 m)	1999	Midtown	Hospital (primarily)	
14	Charles Schwab Tower		12	230 feet (70 m)	2013	Old Mill	Office	
15	Orpheum Tower		16	220 feet (67 m)	1910	Downtown	Residential	
16	The Duo (Central Park Plaza)		16	213 feet (65 m)	1982	Downtown	Residential	
17	Farnam 1600		14	212 feet (65 m)	1917	Downtown	Residential	
18	Blackstone Plaza		14	212 feet (65 m)	1961	Midtown	Office	
19	Westbrook Tower		17	207 feet (63 m)	1966	Downtown	Residential	
20	RiverFront Place Condos II		15	202 feet (62 m)	2011	Downtown	Residential	
21	Omaha Tower		15	200 feet (61 m)	1976	Aksarben	Office	

== Tallest building under construction ==
Picture	Name	Height	Floors	Year	Status	Area	Use	Notes
	Project Health	380 feet (120 m) to 400 feet (122 m)	18-20	2030	Under construction	Midtown	Medical	Will function as a clinical learning and research center, as well as patient hospital, for Nebraska Medicine and UNMC. The $2.19 billion tower will be 50% funded by private dollars.

== Cancelled ==
Name	Height	Floors	Use	Notes
Vortex Tower	610 feet (186 m)	60	Observation Tower	
Post Office Tower	500 feet (152 m)	36	Office/Hotel	
Lanoha Tower	430 feet (131 m)	30	Office/Retail	
Omaha Marriott Hotel	377 feet (115 m)	28	Hotel	
WallStreet Tower	373 feet (114 m)	32	Residential	
Project 19	320 feet (98 m)	20	Office	
HDR, Inc. Corporate Headquarters	265 feet (81 m)	16	Office	

== Timeline of tallest buildings ==
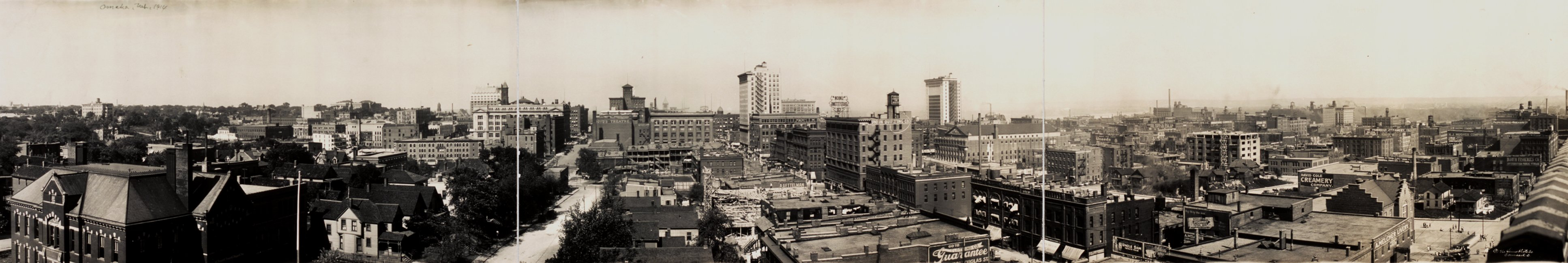

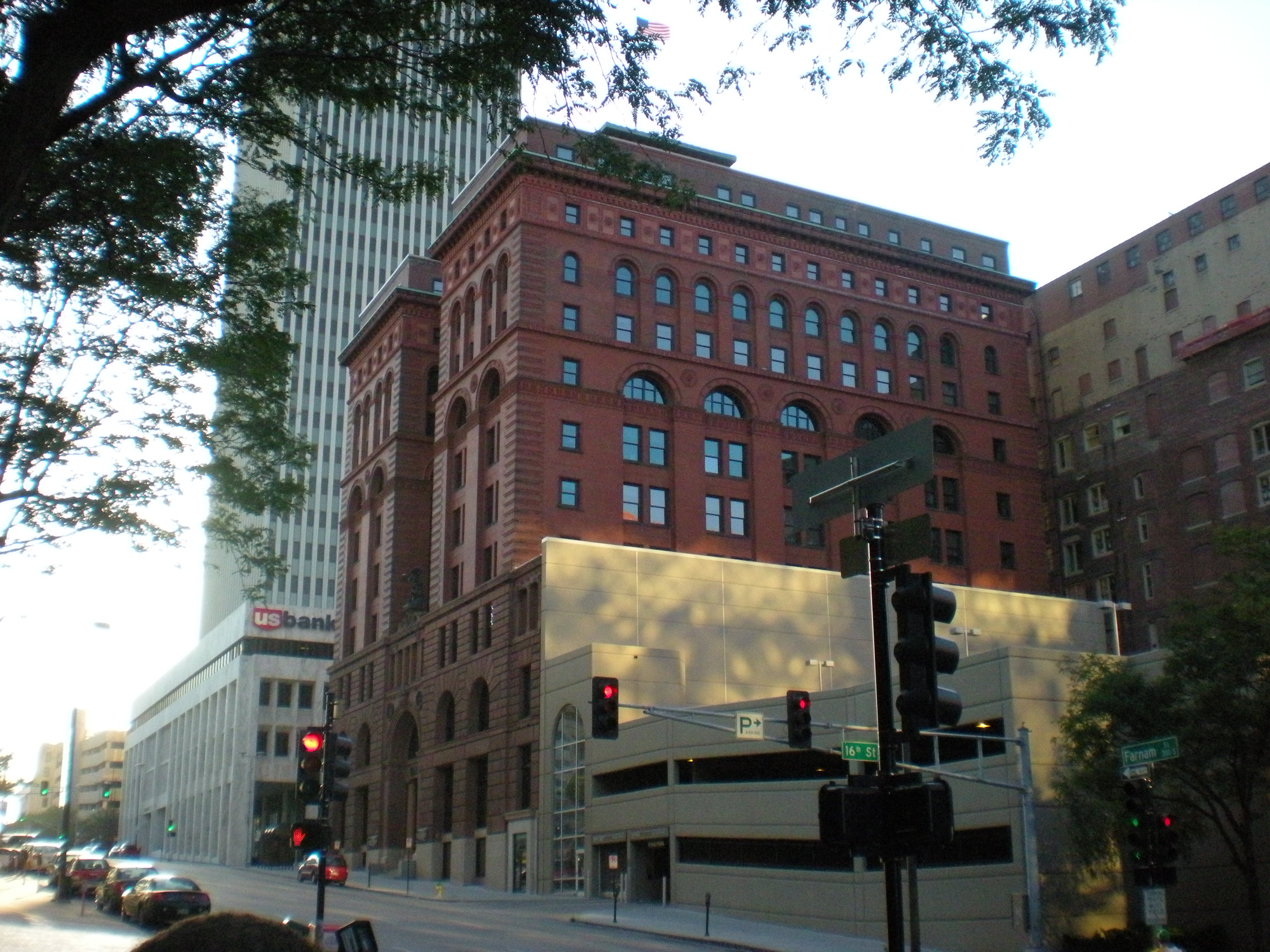
The Omaha National Bank Building was Omaha's first skyscraper.

The following is a list of buildings that were once the tallest structure in Omaha.

Name	Years as tallest	Height feet / m	Floors	Reference
Omaha National Bank Building	1889–1912	180 feet (55 m)	10	
Woodmen of the World Building	1912–1919	245 feet (75 m)	19	
AT&T Building	1919–1969	334 feet (102 m)	16	
Woodmen Tower	1969–2002	478 feet (146 m)	30	
First National Bank Tower	2002–present	634 feet (193 m)	45	

== See also ==
- Architecture in Omaha, Nebraska
- Downtown Omaha
- Tourism in Omaha, Nebraska
- List of tallest buildings in Nebraska
- List of tallest buildings in Lincoln, Nebraska
