= Landmark Center =

Landmark Center or Landmark Centre may refer to:

- 1200 Landmark Center a high-rise and data center complex in Omaha, Nebraska.
- Landmark Arts Centre, in Teddington, London Borough of Richmond upon Thames
- Landmark Center (Boston), a former Sears warehouse
- Landmark Center (St. Paul), in St. Paul, Minnesota
