= Mutual of Omaha Headquarters Tower =

Skyscraper in downtown Omaha, Nebraska, U.S.

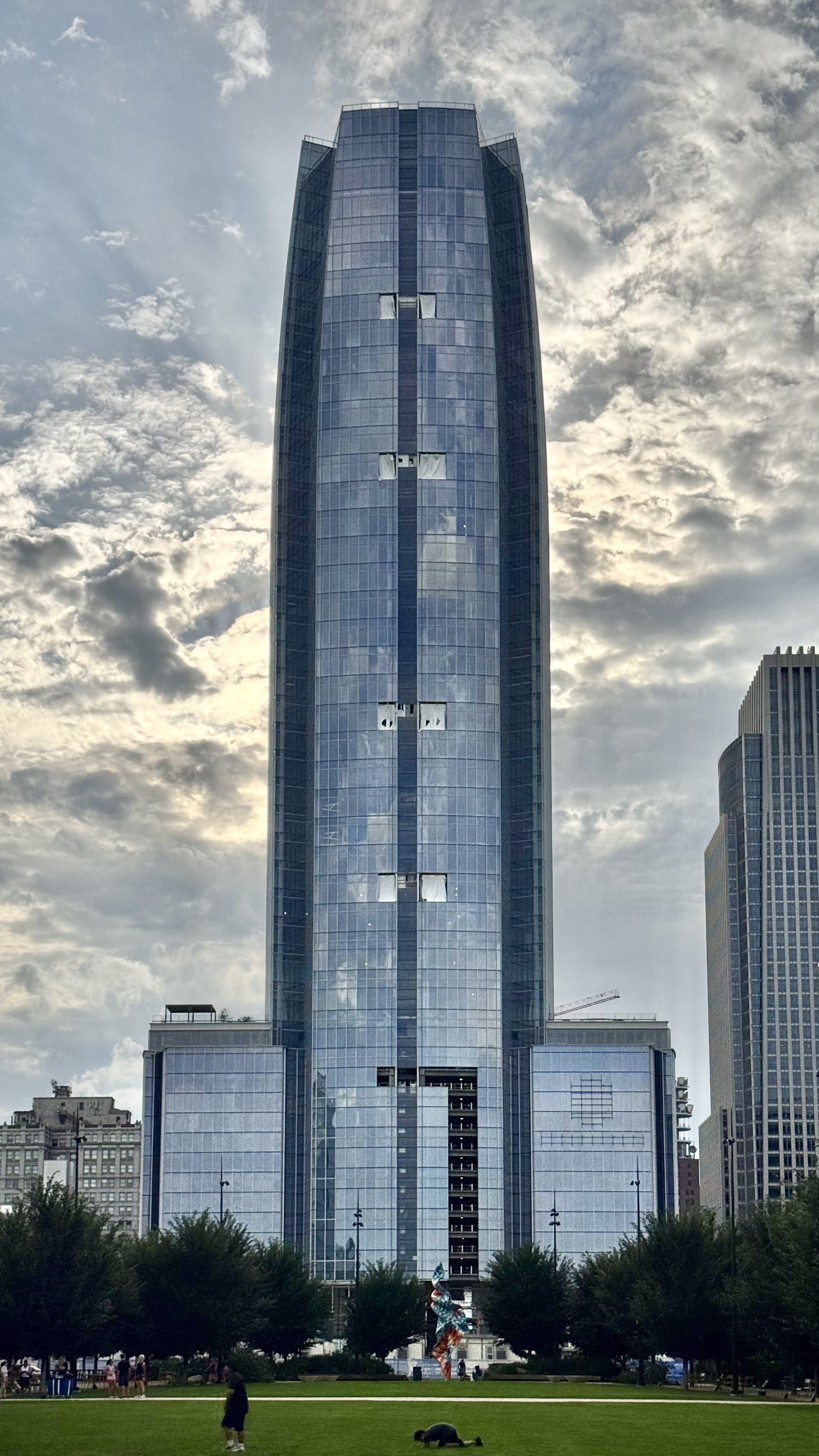
- The tower under construction in August 2026

Record height
- Tallest in Nebraska since 2026^{[I]}
- Preceded by: First National Bank Tower

General information
- Status: Completed
- Type: Office
- Location: 215 South 15th Street, Omaha, Nebraska, United States
- Coordinates: 41.2581°N 95.9351°W
- Construction started: January 2023
- Estimated completion: November 18, 2026
- Opened: November 18, 2026
- Cost: US$600 million

Height
- Roof: 677 feet (206 m)

Technical details
- Floor count: 44
- Floor area: 800,000 sq ft (74,000 m^{2})

Design and construction
- Architects: Pickard Chilton and HOK
- Main contractor: JE Dunn Construction

Other information
- Public transit: Omaha Streetcar (2028)

The Mutual of Omaha Headquarters Tower is a 44-story office skyscraper in Downtown Omaha, Nebraska, United States. Upon its completion in 2026, it is 677 feet (206 m) tall and holds the title as the tallest building in both Omaha and the state; and serves as the headquarters of the Mutual of Omaha Insurance Company.

== History ==
=== Development ===
Concept Art of Mutual of Omaha Headquarters Tower (Project Beacon)

On January 26, 2022, then-Mayor Jean Stothert and Mutual of Omaha CEO James Blackledge announced a pair of major developments for the city. Mutual of Omaha will move its headquarters into the downtown core to the site of the former W. Dale Clark branch of the Omaha Public Library. Alongside this, Stothert also revealed plans for a streetcar from the riverfront park to the University of Nebraska Medical Center.

The plan entailed the library branch to be out of its current building by September 2022, with demolition in December. On February 2, 2022, the Omaha City Council voted 4 to 3 to approve lease agreements for a new downtown library location, in a building at 1401 Jones Street, a spot just west of the Old Market. The skyscraper has a projected price tag of $443 million, later updated to $600 million.

On February 25, 2022, Mutual of Omaha requested more than $60 million in tax increment financing. Omaha Planning Department documents and plans submitted to the city refer to the tower as "Project Beacon." The skyscraper will include 800,000 square feet (74,300 m^{2}) of office space and 2,200 parking stalls, which would be open to public use during evenings and weekends.

=== Construction ===
Groundbreaking of the Mutual of Omaha Headquarters Tower occurred on January 25, 2023, with Mayor Jean Stothert noting that "our goals are the same, to rebuild and reactivate downtown through development".

In April 2025, the Mutual of Omaha Headquarters Tower reached an estimated height of 425 feet (130 m) and 32 stories, and installation began of glass panels on its exterior. By September of that same year, the buildings shear core reached above 650 feet (200 m), surpassing that of First National Bank Tower. In October 2025, the building's shear core topped out, and the building's structural steel topped out in March 2026.

The Mutual of Omaha Headquarters Tower officially opened on November 18, 2026.

== Design ==
The skyscraper will feature a street-level lobby with a conference center and an “experience center” to share Mutual of Omaha's history, brand, and impact. A five-floor sky lobby will offer food service, a fitness center, wellness services, technical support, and conference and meeting spaces. Landscaped outdoor terraces on the sky lobby’s 16th to 18th floors will provide outdoor dining and views of downtown Omaha. A two-floor conference facility, planned to be on the 44th floor, will contain a large conference room as well as a variety of other meeting spaces.

== Gallery ==
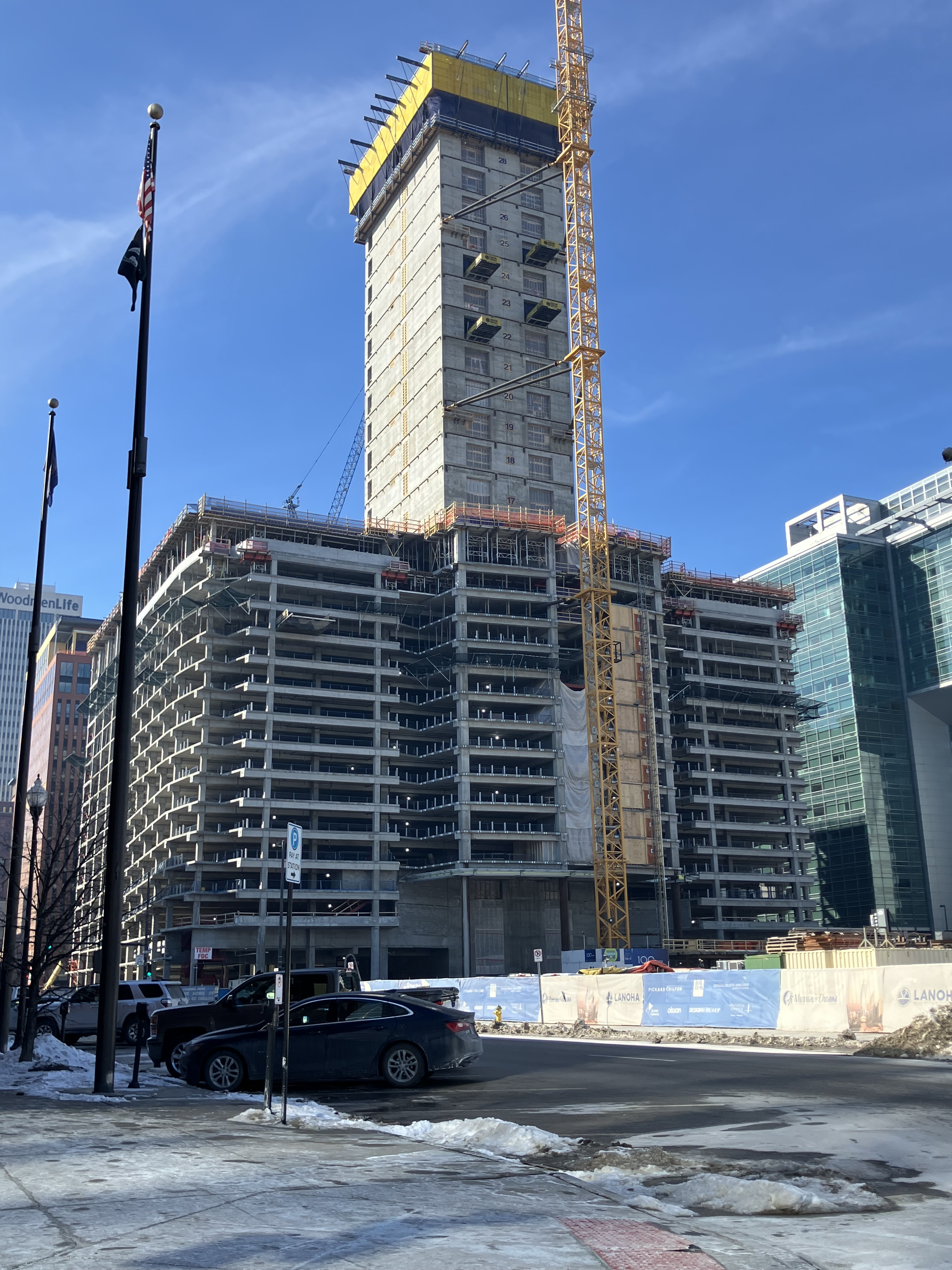
Construction in February 2025

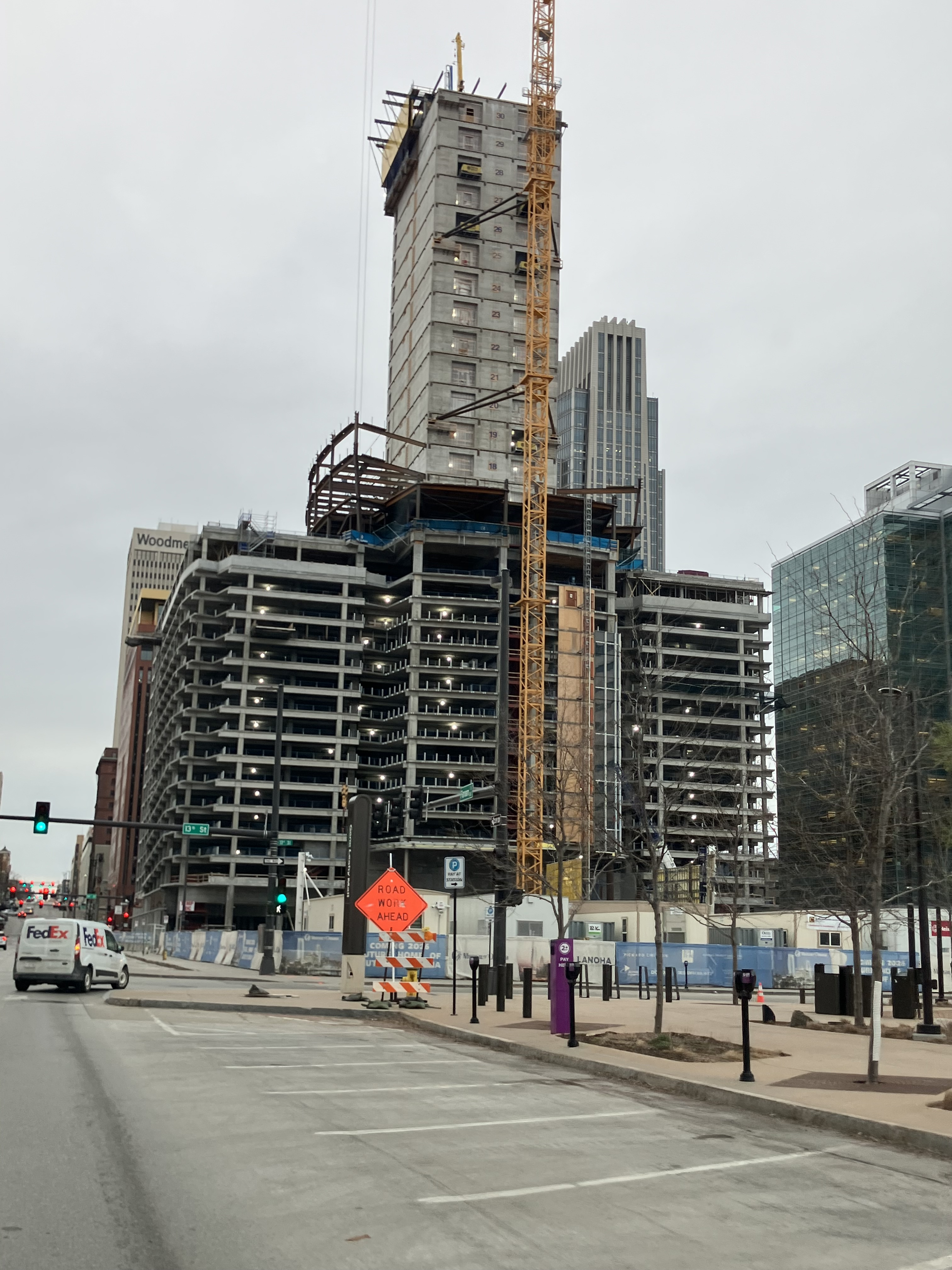
Construction in March 2025

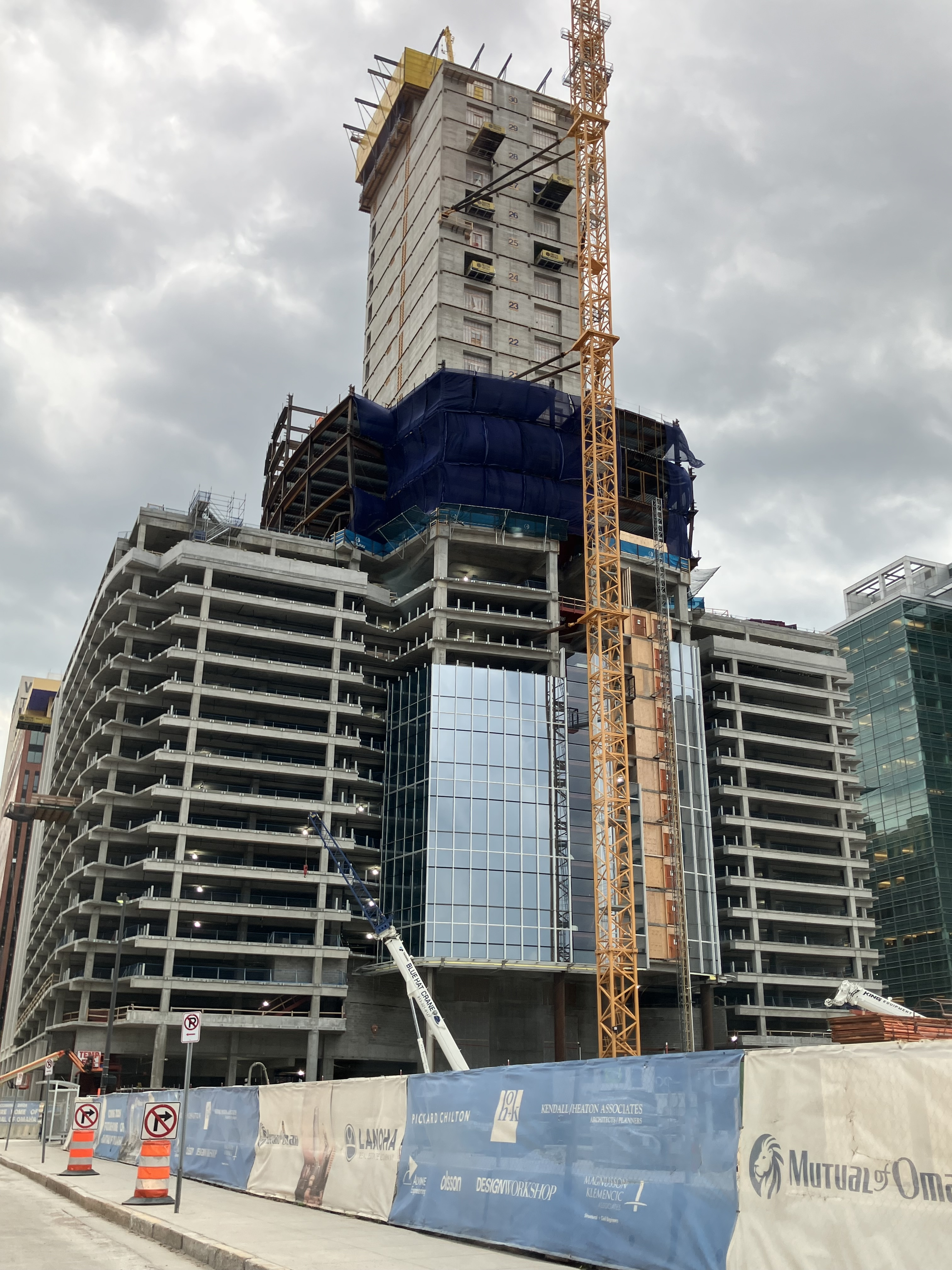
Construction in April 2025

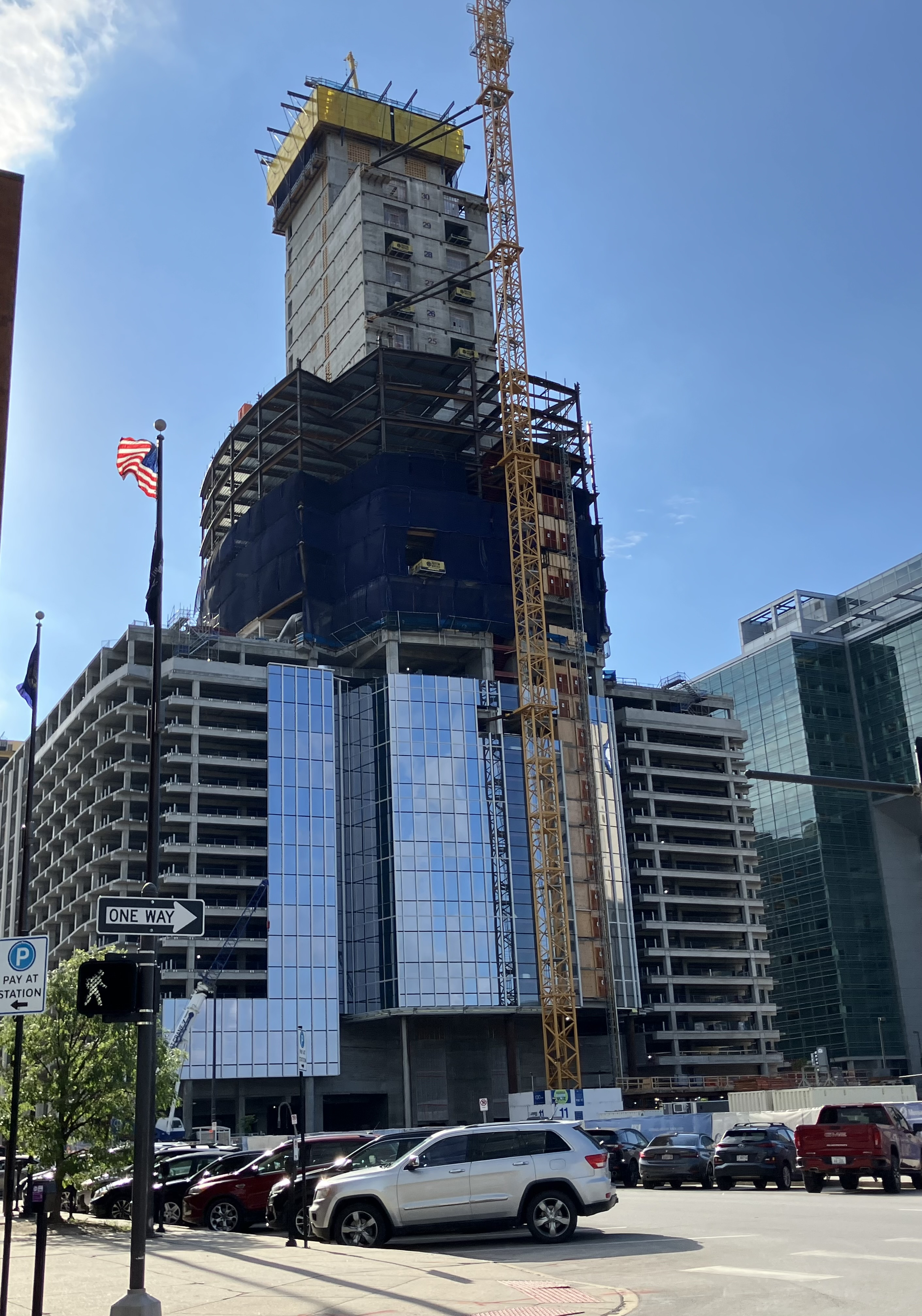
Construction in May 2025

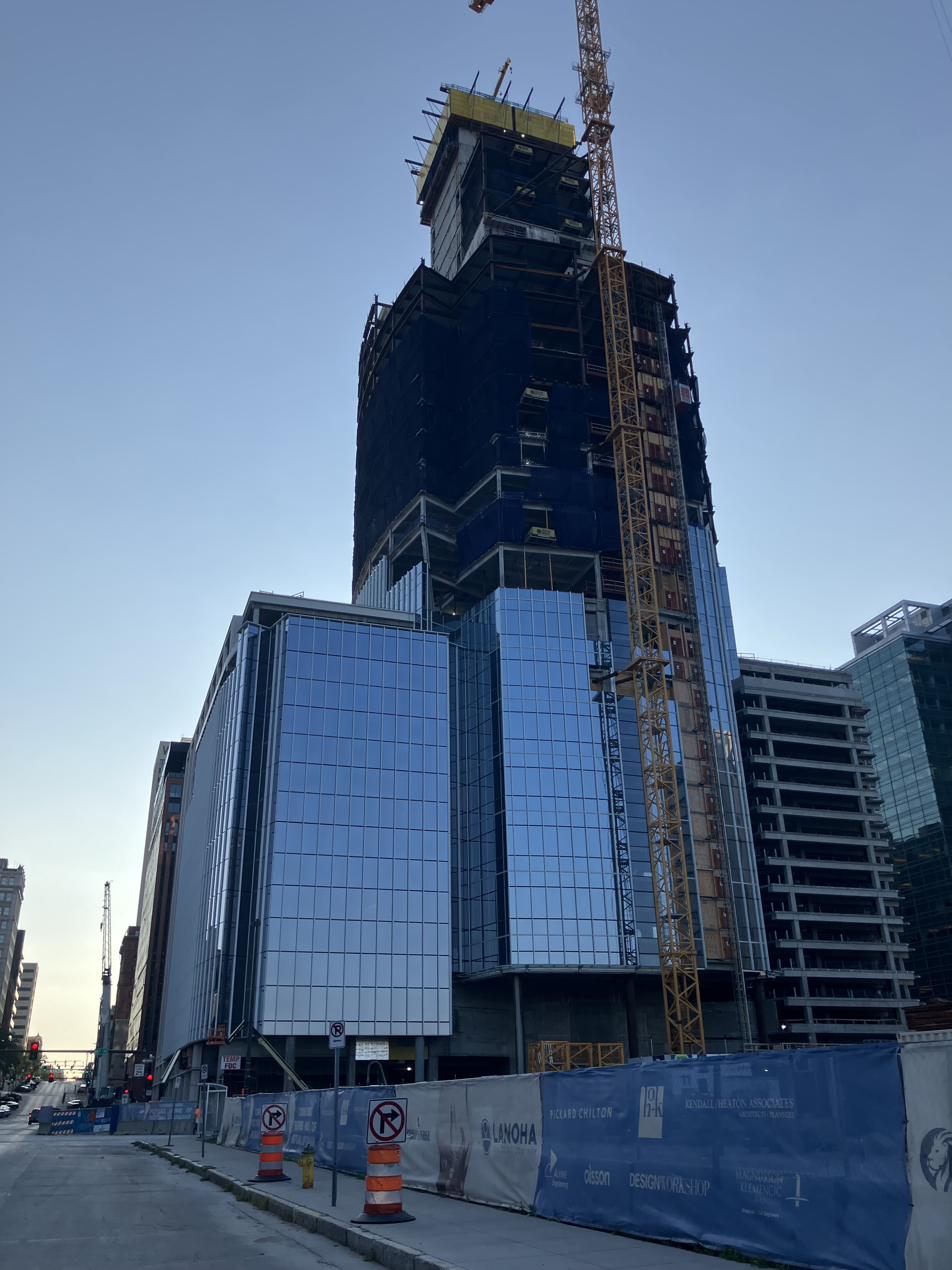
Construction in July 2025

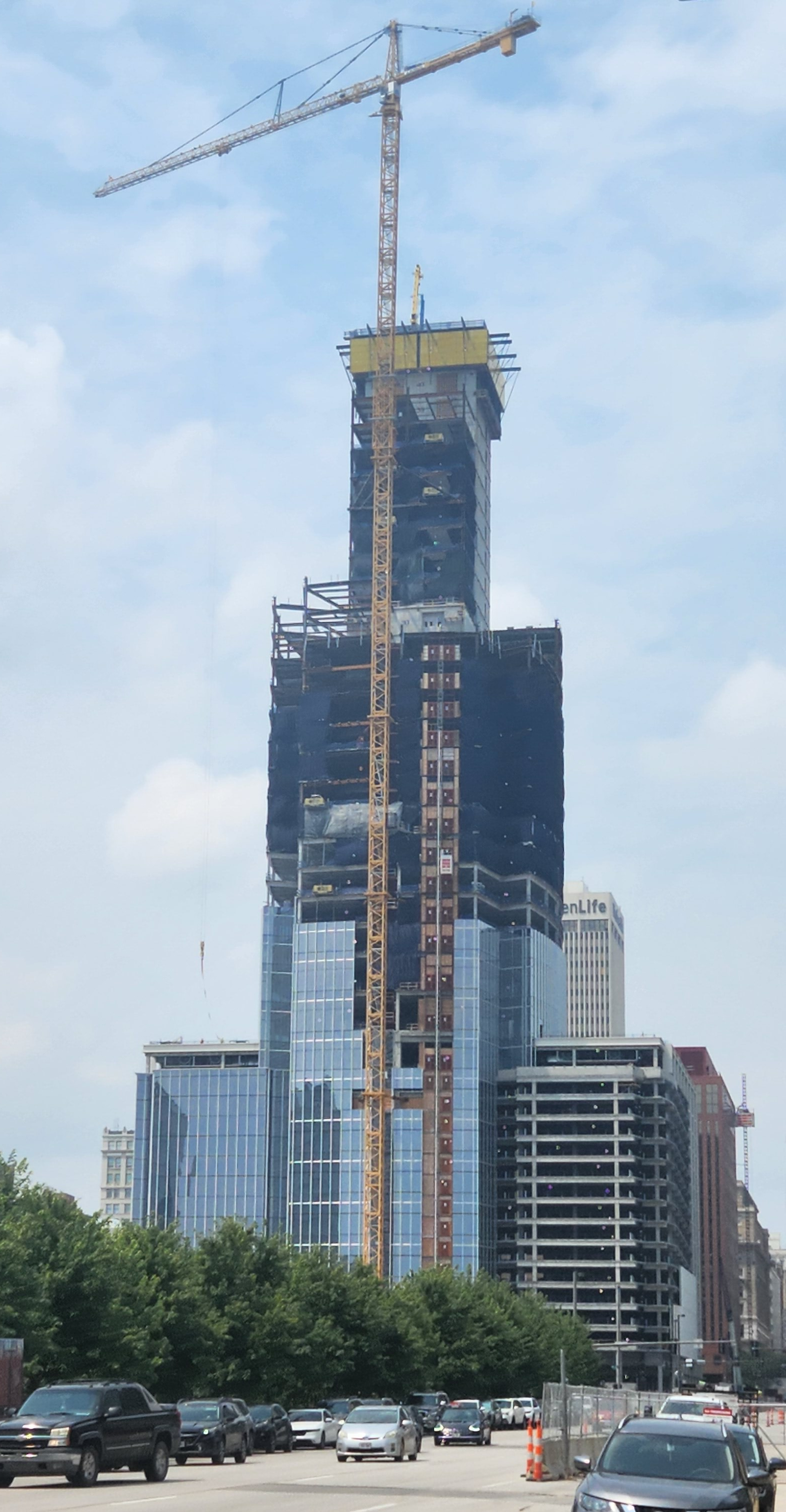
Construction in August 2025

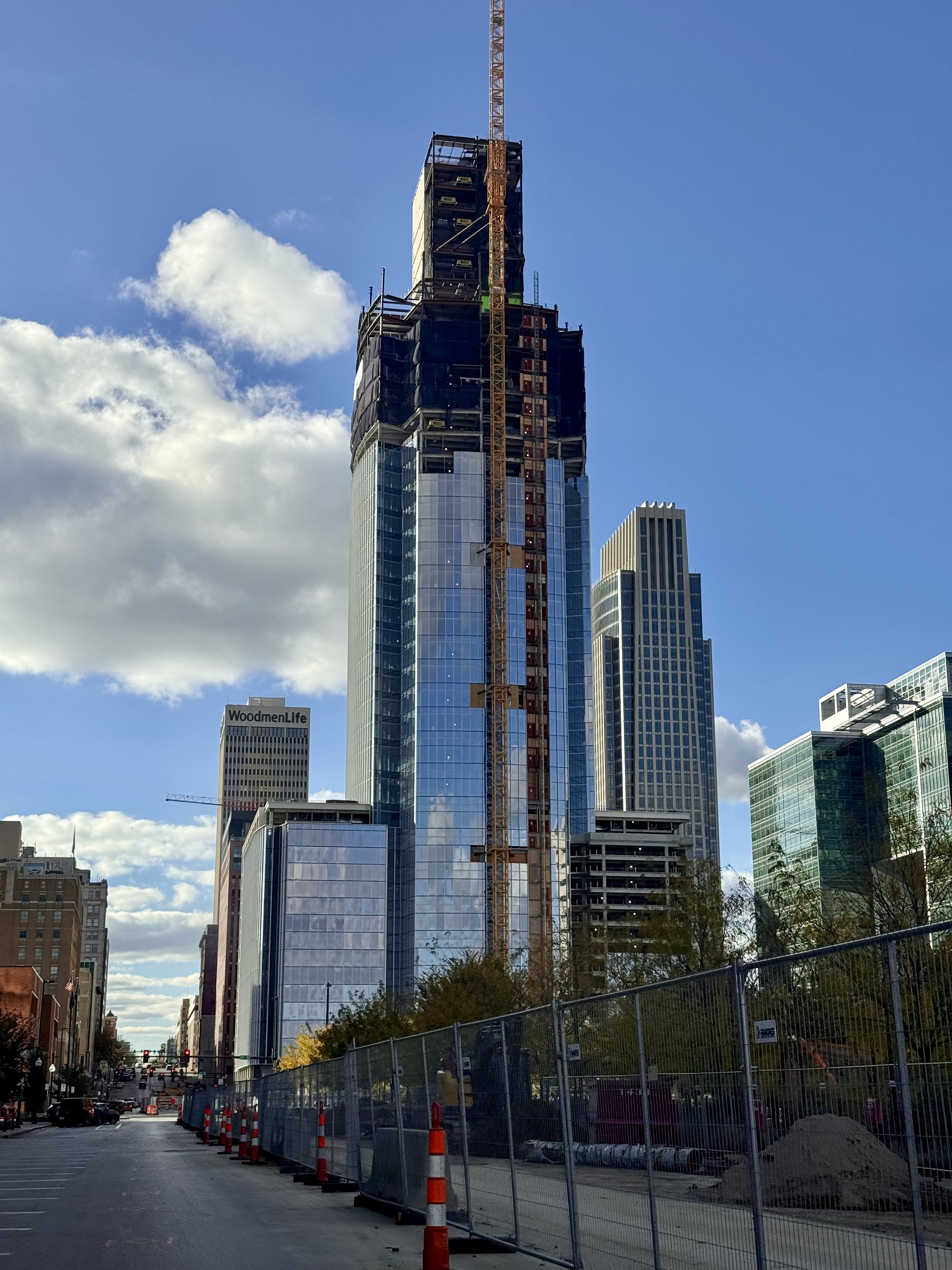
Construction in November 2025

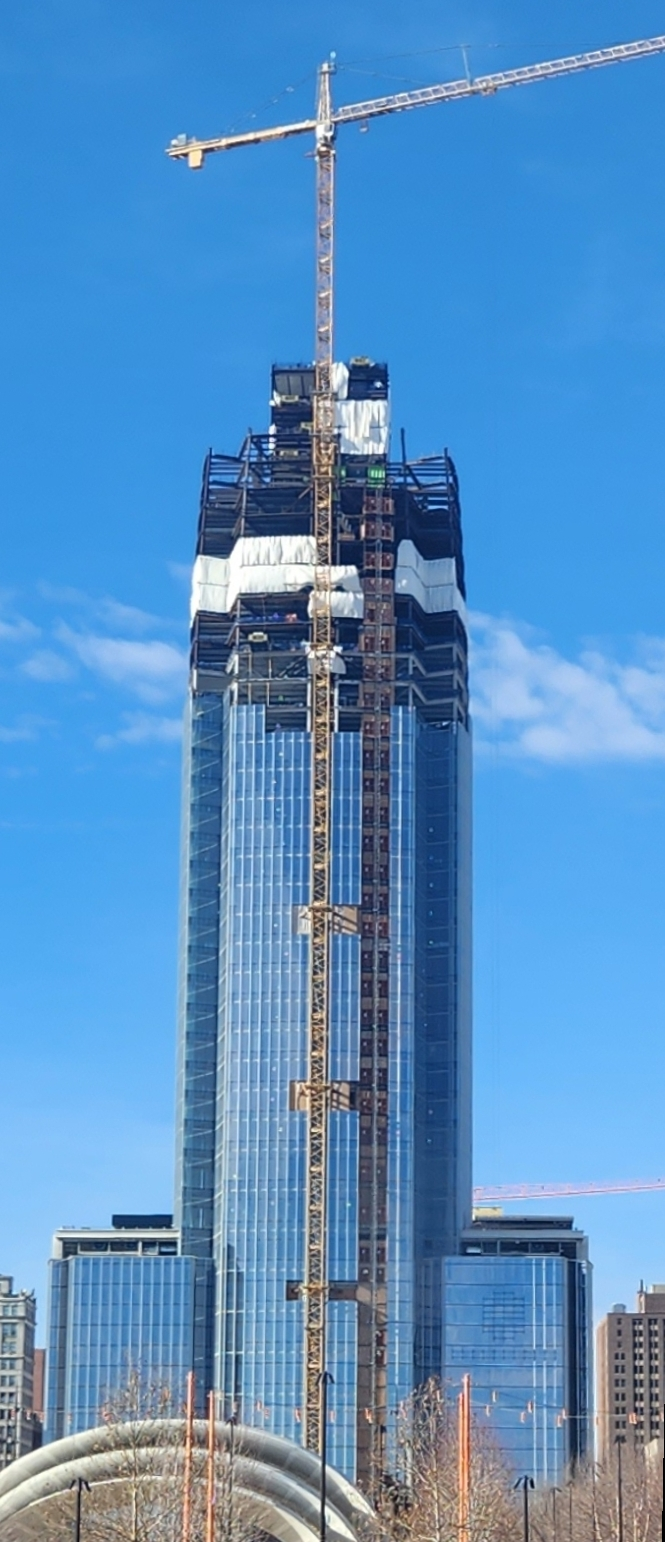
Construction in December 2025

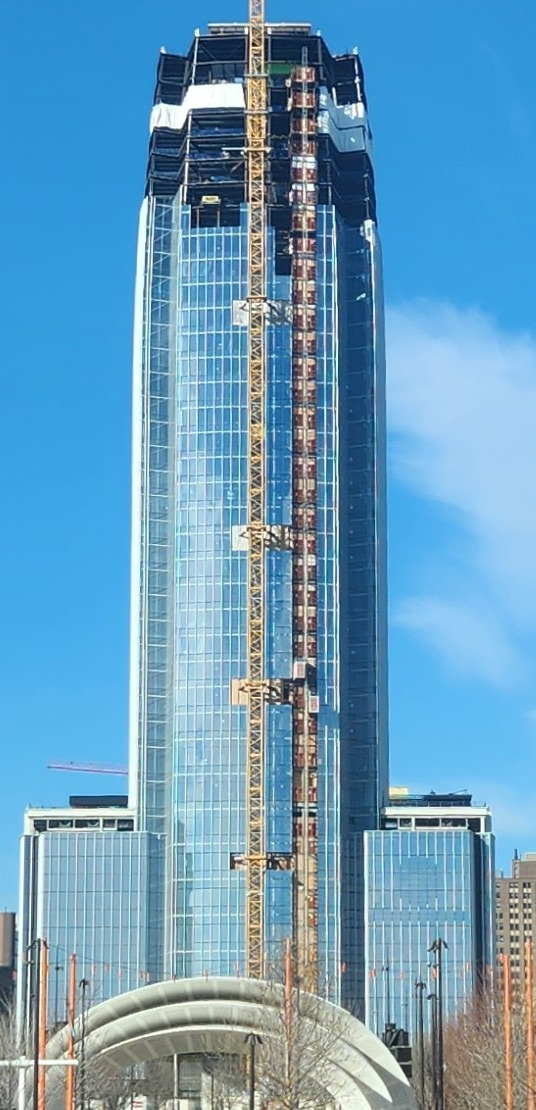
Construction in February 2026

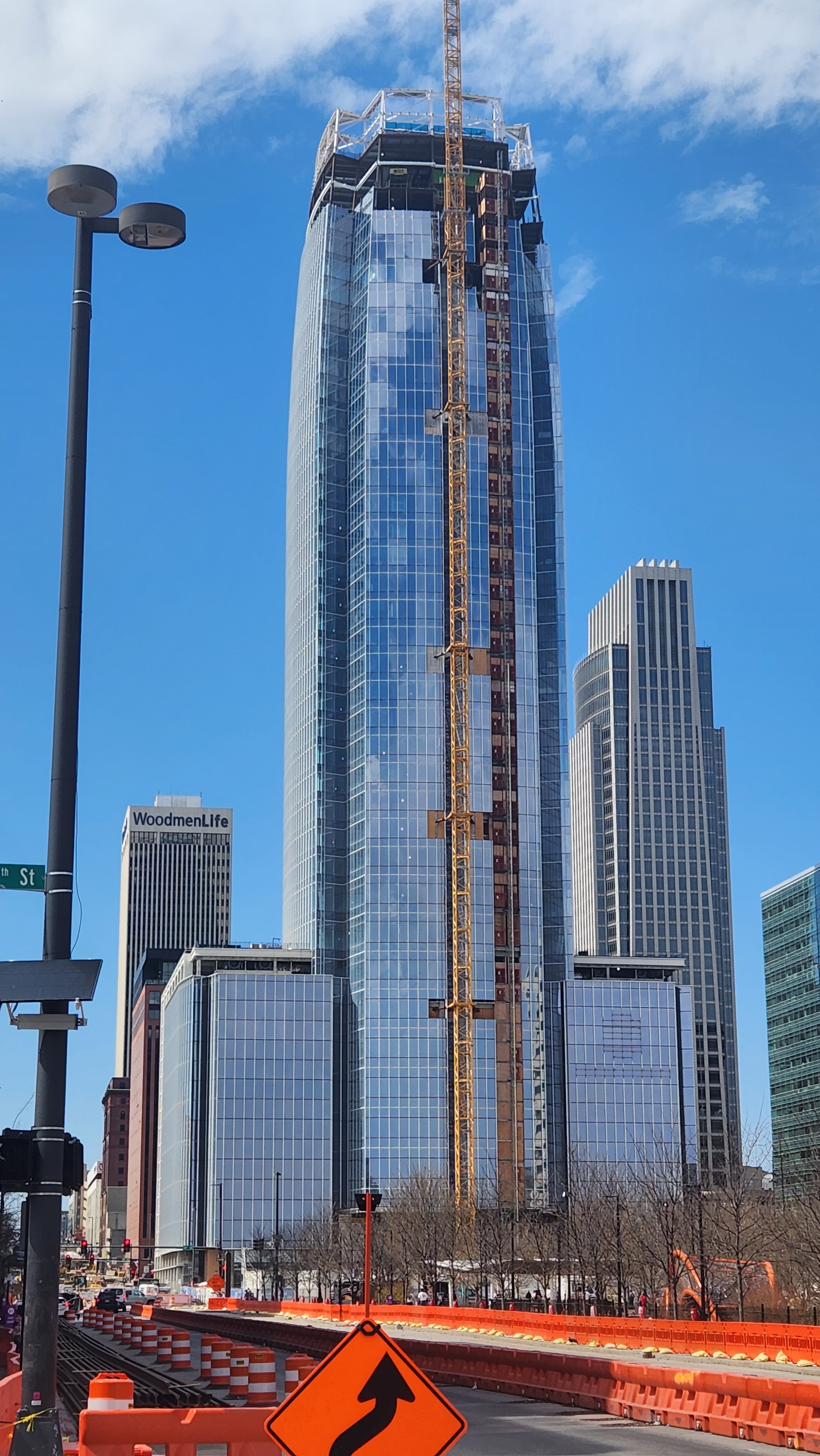
Construction in March 2026

== See also ==
- Economy of Omaha, Nebraska
- List of tallest buildings in Nebraska
- List of tallest buildings in Omaha
- List of tallest buildings by U.S. state and territory
- Mutual of Omaha
- Mutual of Omaha Building
- Omaha Streetcar
