= Mutual of Omaha Building =

High-rise building in Omaha, Nebraska

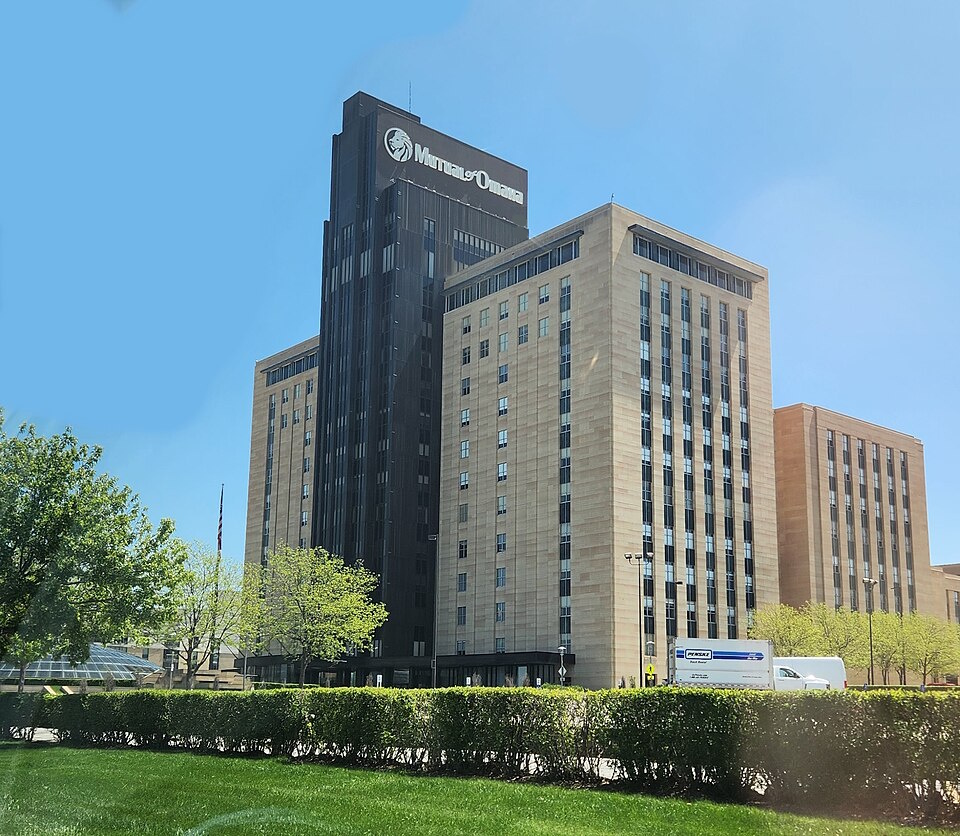
- Mutual of Omaha Building in 2025
- Interactive map of the Mutual of Omaha Building area

General information
- Status: Completed
- Location: Omaha, Nebraska, U.S., 3301 Dodge Street
- Coordinates: 41°15′31″N 95°57′44″W
- Completed: 1940
- Expanded: 1948, 1958, 1970

Height
- Roof: 285 ft (87 m)

Technical details
- Floor count: 14

Other information
- Public transit access: Metro Transit

The Mutual of Omaha Building is a 285-foot (87 m), 14-story high-rise building in Midtown Omaha, Nebraska, United States. Built in 1940, the building was expanded in the 1940s, 1950s, and had a tower addition completed in 1970. It is currently the sixth tallest building in Omaha. The building houses the headquarters of Mutual of Omaha Insurance Company, and is the largest building in Mutual of Omaha's Midtown Crossing development. Joined to the main building, the Mutual of Omaha Dome is an underground facility topped by a large glass dome, built in 1979. The dome houses an employee café.

== History ==
Ground for the original Mutual of Omaha Building occurred on September 4, 1939. The building opened in 1940. Two additions were made in 1948 and 1958. A tower addition was announced in the late 1960s. The addition was topped-out in April 1969. The tower addition was completed and opened in 1970.

In January 1978, a $10 million three-story dome was announced to be built directly North of the building. The dome would be 15 feet (4.6 m) tall and would span 90 feet (27 m) across. Mutual of Omaha built the facility underground because the lack of exterior construction would save $5 million. The dome officially opened in November 1979. In 1989, along with Woodmen Tower, the building was used to help restore the population of Peregrine falcons.

In 2006, it was announced that Mutual of Omaha would be developing Midtown Crossing at Turner Park directly East of their headquarters. The mixed-use development officially opened in May 2010. In 2008, the front of the building was covered with a 14-story banner promoting the Mutual of Omaha Swimvitational. In 2009, during the Centennial celebration for Mutual of Omaha, the building was covered in panels showing a tiger. Additionally, leaves were projected onto the sides of the building.

In 2017, Mutual of Omaha announced plans to build a new headquarters in Midtown Omaha. These plans were later put on pause in 2019. In 2020, Mutual of Omaha announced that the Indian Chief sign on top of the building would be removed. It was replaced by an African Lion. In 2022, Mutual of Omaha revised its headquarters plans and announced that it would build a new headquarters in Downtown Omaha. Upon completion of the new headquarters, the previous headquarters will be preserved and used for re-development plans.

== See also ==
- Economy of Omaha, Nebraska
- List of tallest buildings in Omaha, Nebraska
