= Union Pacific Center =

High-rise office building in Omaha, Nebraska, U.S.

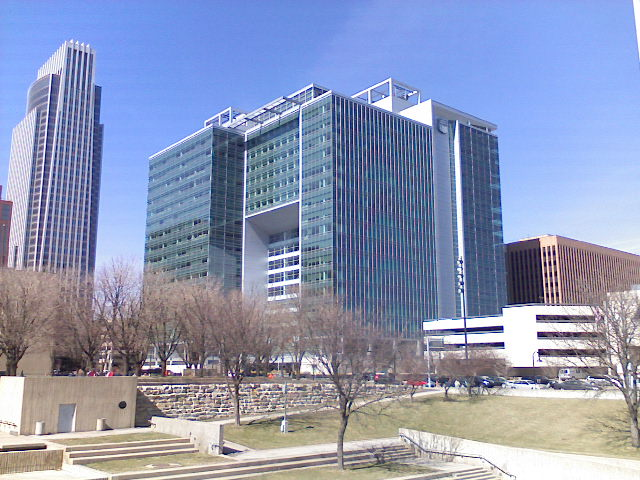
- Union Pacific Center in 2007

General information
- Status: Completed
- Type: Union Pacific Corporate Headquarters
- Location: 1400 Douglas Street; Omaha, Nebraska; United States
- Coordinates: 41°15′33″N 95°56′07″W
- Groundbreaking: May 10, 2002
- Completed: 2004
- Opened: June 2, 2004

Height
- Roof: 317 ft (97 m)

Technical details
- Floor count: 19

Design and construction
- Architect: Gensler (Design Architect) Kendall/Heaton Associates Inc. (Architect of Record)
- Main contractor: Holder Construction Company

Other information
- Public transit: Metro Transit

Union Pacific Center at 1400 Douglas Street is a high-rise building in downtown Omaha, Nebraska. It houses the headquarters of the Union Pacific Railroad and its parent company, the Union Pacific Corporation. Officially opened in June 2004, it rises 317 feet (97 m), making it the fifth-tallest building in Omaha.

== History ==
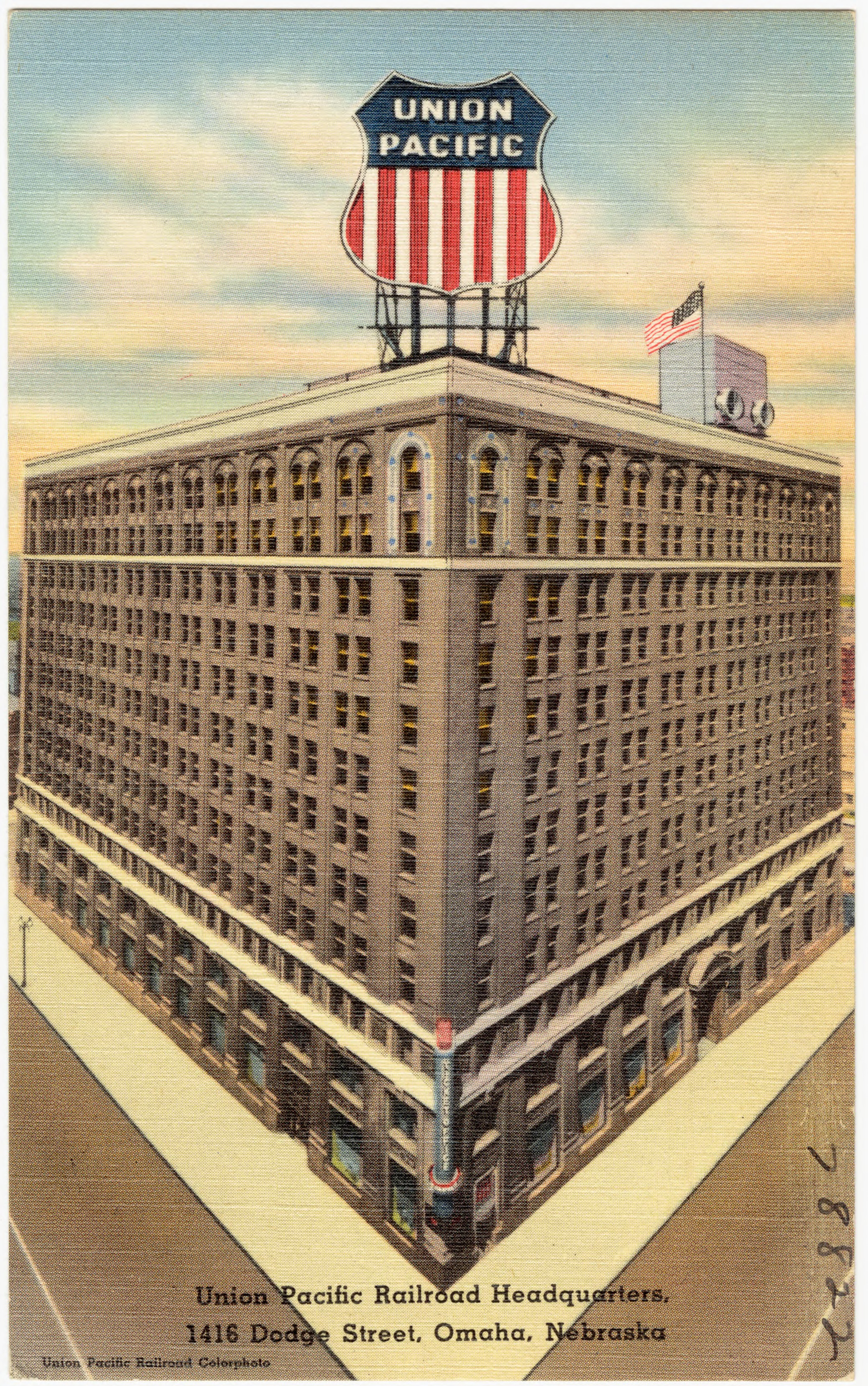
The previous headquarters of Union Pacific. Built in 1910 and demolished in 2008.

In April 1999, Union Pacific Corporation, then based in Dallas, Texas, announced that it would be moving its headquarters to Omaha, Nebraska. Their first headquarters in Omaha was built in 1910 and hadn't been expanded since 1971. Construction of a new Union Pacific headquarters had been speculated for years. However, it wasn't until June, 2001, that plans for a new headquarters were announced. The building would have 19 floors, contain 1,100,000 square feet (0.10 km^{2}) of space, and was at an estimated cost of $260 million. Union Pacific also announced that it would consolidate employees from ten locations in Omaha, with around 700 customer service jobs from St. Louis, Missouri.

The center was built on the former site of the Rialto Theater, which was demolished in 1986 to make a parking lot. The rest of the buildings were demolished in December 2001. Ground was broken on May 10, 2002, commemorating the 133rd anniversary of the golden spike. Union Pacific Center officially opened on June 2, 2004.

== Design ==
The Union Pacific Center is often described as resembling a cube, due to the building's width to height ratio. The façade is made primarily granite, and tinted glass. The Union Pacific Center contains several setbacks.

== Gallery ==
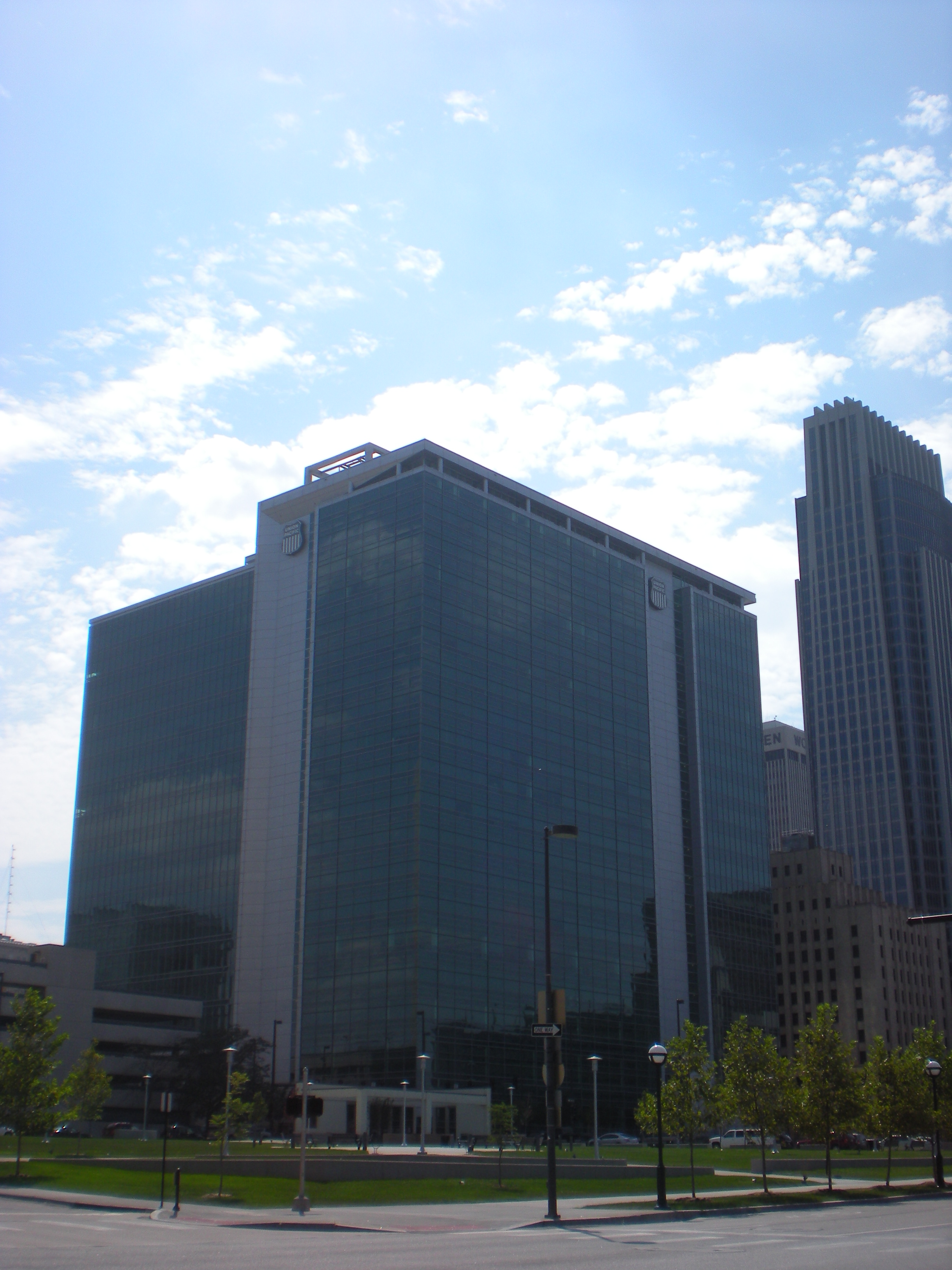
Looking Southwest

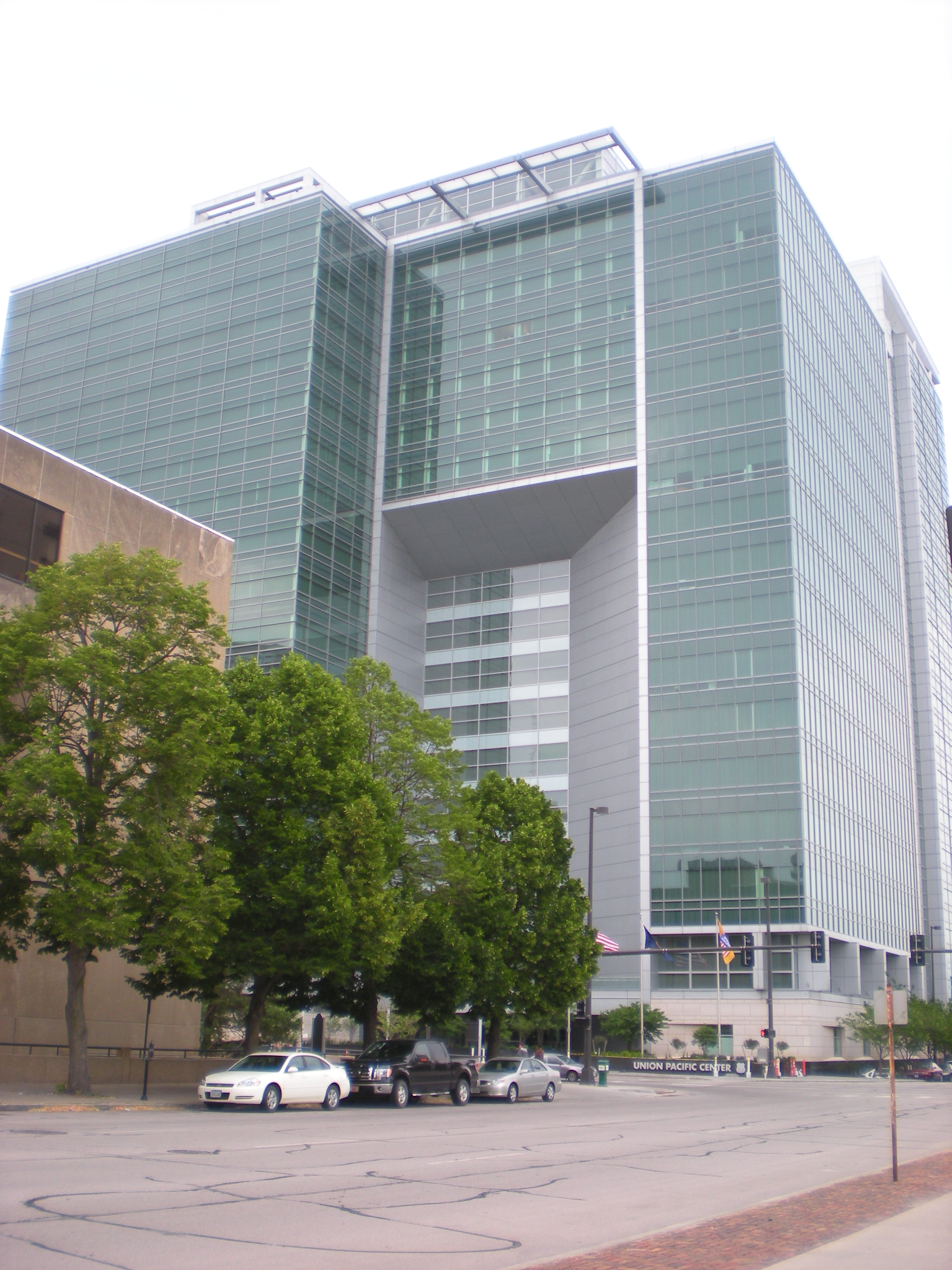
Southeast view from the Gene Leahy Mall

== See also ==
- Economy of Omaha, Nebraska
- List of tallest buildings in Omaha, Nebraska
