= Elmwood Tower =

High-rise apartment complex in Omaha, Nebraska, U.S.

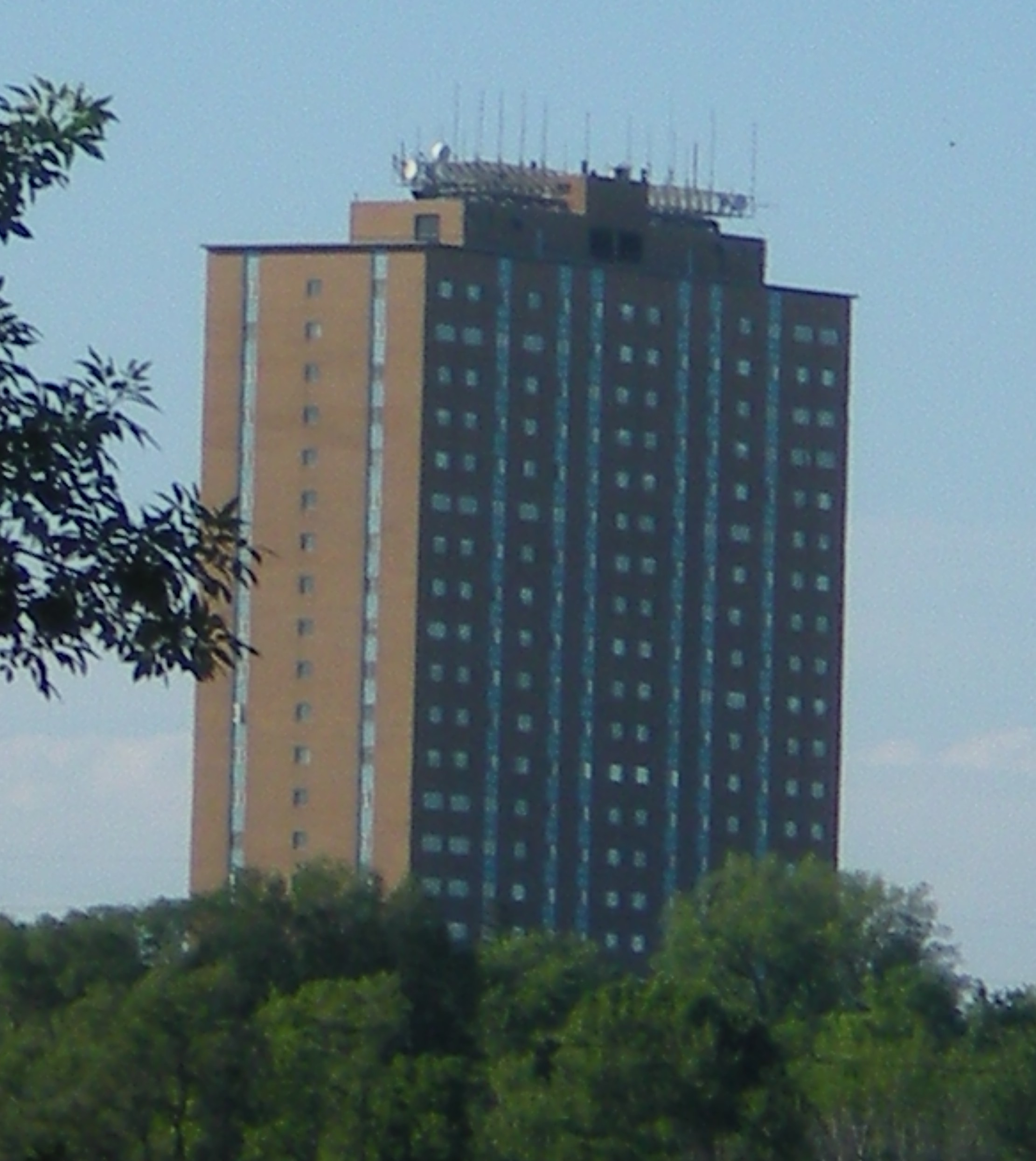
- Elmwood Tower in 2010
- Interactive map of the Elmwood Tower area
- Former names: Masonic Manor

General information
- Status: Completed
- Type: Residential
- Architectural style: Modernist
- Location: Omaha, Nebraska, U.S., 801 South 52nd Street
- Coordinates: 41°15′07″N 95°59′40″W
- Completed: 1964

Height
- Roof: 320 ft (98 m) (disputed)

Technical details
- Floor count: 23

Design and construction
- Architect: Rorick Construction
- Other designers: John Latenser & Sons

Other information
- Public transit: Metro Transit

The Elmwood Tower (formerly known as the Masonic Manor) is a high-rise residential building located in Midtown Omaha, Nebraska, United States. Completed in 1964, the 320 ft (98 m), 23 story building, is currently the fifth-tallest building in Omaha. When construction began in 1961, the Federal Housing Administration (FHA) granted the largest mortgage to the Midwest in their history to the project, totaling $4.9 million USD. The building was originally constructed to house members of the Masons and their families. Today, it provides residential living for people aged 55 and older.

== Description ==
Elmwood Tower is a 320 ft (98 m) tall skyscraper located at 801 South 52nd Street in midtown Omaha, Nebraska that functions as an independent living apartment complex. The Elmwood Tower, formerly known as the Masonic Manor, was closely tied to the Freemason group who built and managed the property through the Masonic Manor Apartment Hotel corporation. Originally, the building had 320 units, 240 bedroom apartments and 80 efficiency units, but following renovations and room combinations, there are now 219 units. There are an additional 4 bedrooms designated for visitors, and each room is fire-proofed and sound proofed. While not a condo, residents purchase leases that they can later sell; the original cost for a room was $3,500 to $4,500, along with a monthly fee. As of 2014, units cost between $50,000 and $70,000. The building includes a parking garage, 4 elevators, a library, dining space, and a 4-acre (1.6 ha) garden.

There are a total of 23 floors and the building follows a modernist style of architecture. The Elmwood Tower stands on a hill 210 feet (64 m) above the Missouri River. By elevation, this places the Elmwood Tower as the second tallest building in Omaha at 1,233 ft (376 m).

While commonly believed to be 320 ft (98 m), the exact height of the building has been subject to misreporting. When the building was first constructed, the Omaha World-Herald reported that the building was 242 ft (74 m). Estimates by Emporis.com formerly listed the main roof height at 234 ft (71 m) and an architectural height of 256 ft (78 m). The Lincoln Journal Star previously proposed that the total number of 320 units was mistaken for the total height. Assuming the 320 ft (98 m) estimate is correct, this would have briefly made the Elmwood Tower the tallest building in Omaha until the WoodmanLife Tower was built in 1969. This also places the Elmwood Tower as the 3rd tallest building in Omaha.

== History ==
In 1960, the Grand Lodge of Ancient Free and Accepted Masons of Nebraska began looking for sites to construct a new high-rise apartment. Initially, the Masons wanted to establish the building at 40th and Cuming street in downtown Omaha, on the same site at the Samuel Mercer mansion and near the St. Cecilia Cathedral. The Mercer family and the Freemasons were unable to come to an agreement and a new site was selected at 52nd and Leavenworth streets. The 4½-acre lot was purchased from W.B. Millard Jr. for $225,000. The tower was formally incorporated on July 27, 1960 as a non-profit entity that was sponsored by the Freemasons. Prior to the Elmwood Tower's construction, the former home of William R. McKeen (known as the McKeen-Rees-Millard home) stood on the lot; demolition at the site occurred on October 15, 1961. Early estimates for the project listed a total cost of $5.5 million.

The Elmwood Tower was financed by a Federal Housing Administration (FHA) mortgage totaling $4.9 million. This mortgage was backed by the Philadelphia teachers pension fund and was the largest mortgage ever approved by the FHA to a project located in the Midwest. John Latenser & Sons designed the building, Rorick Construction served as the contractor, and approximately $6 million worth of steel and concrete were used in construction. A full scale model of one of the rooms for the planned building was constructed on the 6th floor of the Masonic Temple Building in downtown Omaha.

By spring 1962, 307 of the 320 total rooms had been leased out and the Masons announced they aimed to open the tower on Thanksgiving Day, 1963. On November 20, 1962, Freemason grand secretary Carl Greisen reported that construction of the Elmwood Tower was 28 days ahead of schedule. The Shriner Legion of Honor visited the site on May 17, 1963. During this visit, the group was part of the topping ceremony to place the last steel girder; this beam was decorated with a United States Flag that previously had flown atop the United States Capital building. In June 1963, the cornerstone was laid by Ralph M. Carhart, Grand Master of Masons in Nebraska, and the ceremony was attended by Senator Roman Hruska. Construction on the Elmwood tower ended in 1964, where it was originally referred to as the Masonic Manor. Following completion, Norman Warwick, leader of a Masonic auxiliary group, was the first resident in April 1964. Residency was initially limited to Masons and their widows over the age of 62. In 1968, the building was bailed out by residents after running into financial difficulties, and, in response, residency was expanded to those who were 50 years old and to non-Masons.

On August 28, 1970, an incident involving a lit cigarette led to a third alarm fire on the fifth floor of the tower; over 120 firefighters responded. The fire was largely contained to two rooms due to the building's fireproofing features, including a ventilation system that automatically sealed when detecting temperatures over 180 °F (82 °C). One hundred residents, approximately one third of the total occupants, had to be rescued by firefighters. The building's construction, firefighters' efforts, and residents' cooperation were all identified as factors that limited total casualties. The fire was reported at 7:00 A.M. and under control within an hour. In total, three people lost their lives, including the owner of a local utilities company and a 19 year old man.

In the early 2000s, a sprinkler system was installed. In 2009, the building was renamed from the Masonic Manor to the Elmwood Tower. In 2023, another fire broke out at the Elmwood tower, resulting in $20,000 worth in damages but no injuries.

== Notable tenants ==
- Thelma Sutcliffe, formerly the oldest living person in the United States.

== See also ==
- Economy of Omaha, Nebraska
- List of tallest buildings in Omaha, Nebraska
