= City National Bank Building (Omaha) =

- City National Bank Building and Creighton Orpheum Theater
- U.S. National Register of Historic Places
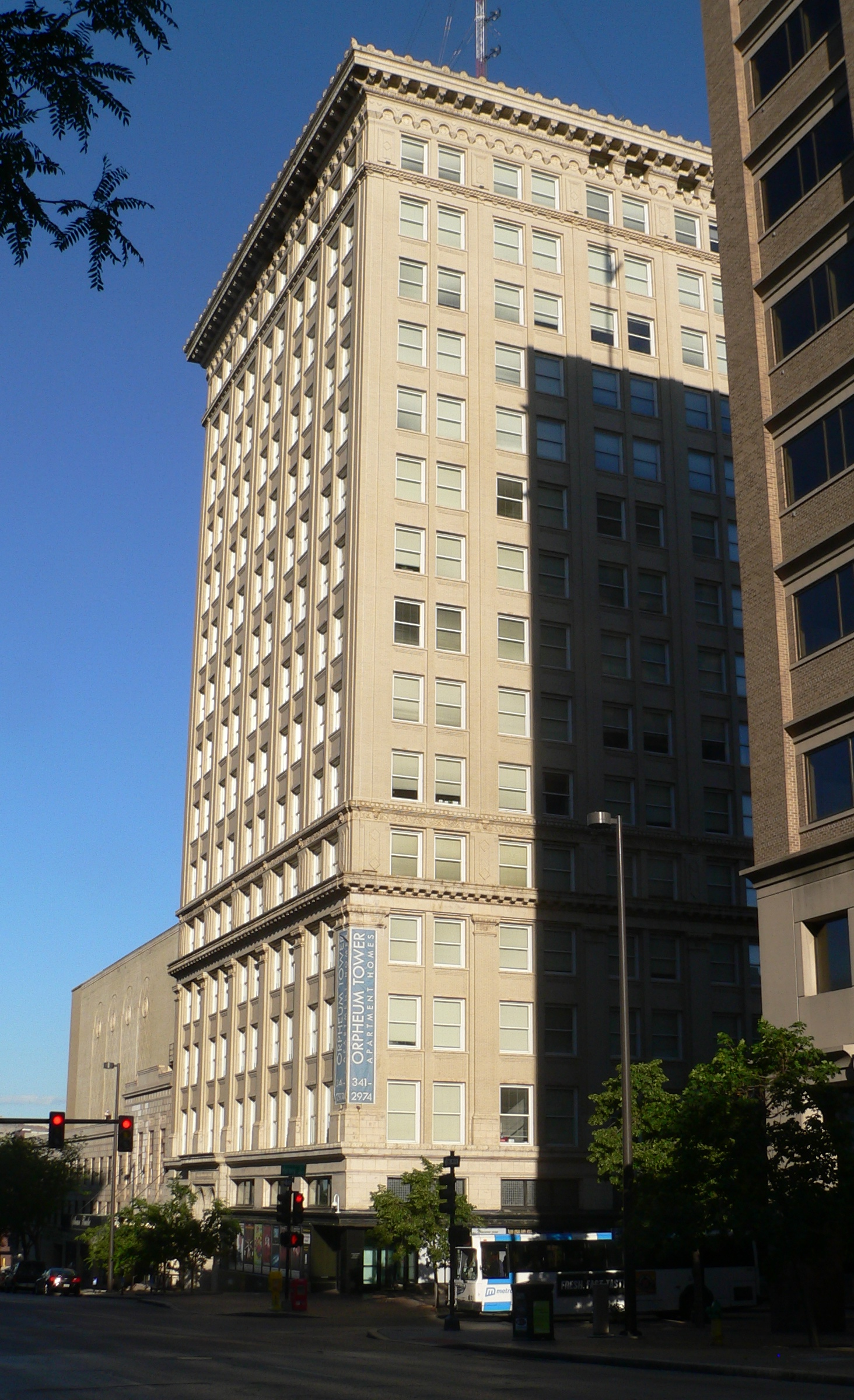

- Location within Nebraska
- Location: 16th and Harney Streets, Omaha, Nebraska
- Coordinates: 41°15′22.8″N 95°56′12.7″W
- Built: 1895
- Architect: Holabird & Roche; Harry Lawrie
- Architectural style: Italianate
- MPS: Opera House Buildings in Nebraska 1867-1917 MPS (AD)
- NRHP reference No.: 73001061
- Added to NRHP: March 26, 1973

City National Bank Building, also known as the Orpheum Tower, is a 220 ft, 16 story, tower in Downtown Omaha, Nebraska. When built in 1910, it was the tallest building in Omaha. It remained the tallest building until 1912 when the Woodmen of the World was completed. It was added to the NRHP in 1973. The building is now known as the Orpheum Tower and is a 132-unit apartment building.
