= AT&T Building (Omaha) =

High-rise building in Omaha, Nebraska

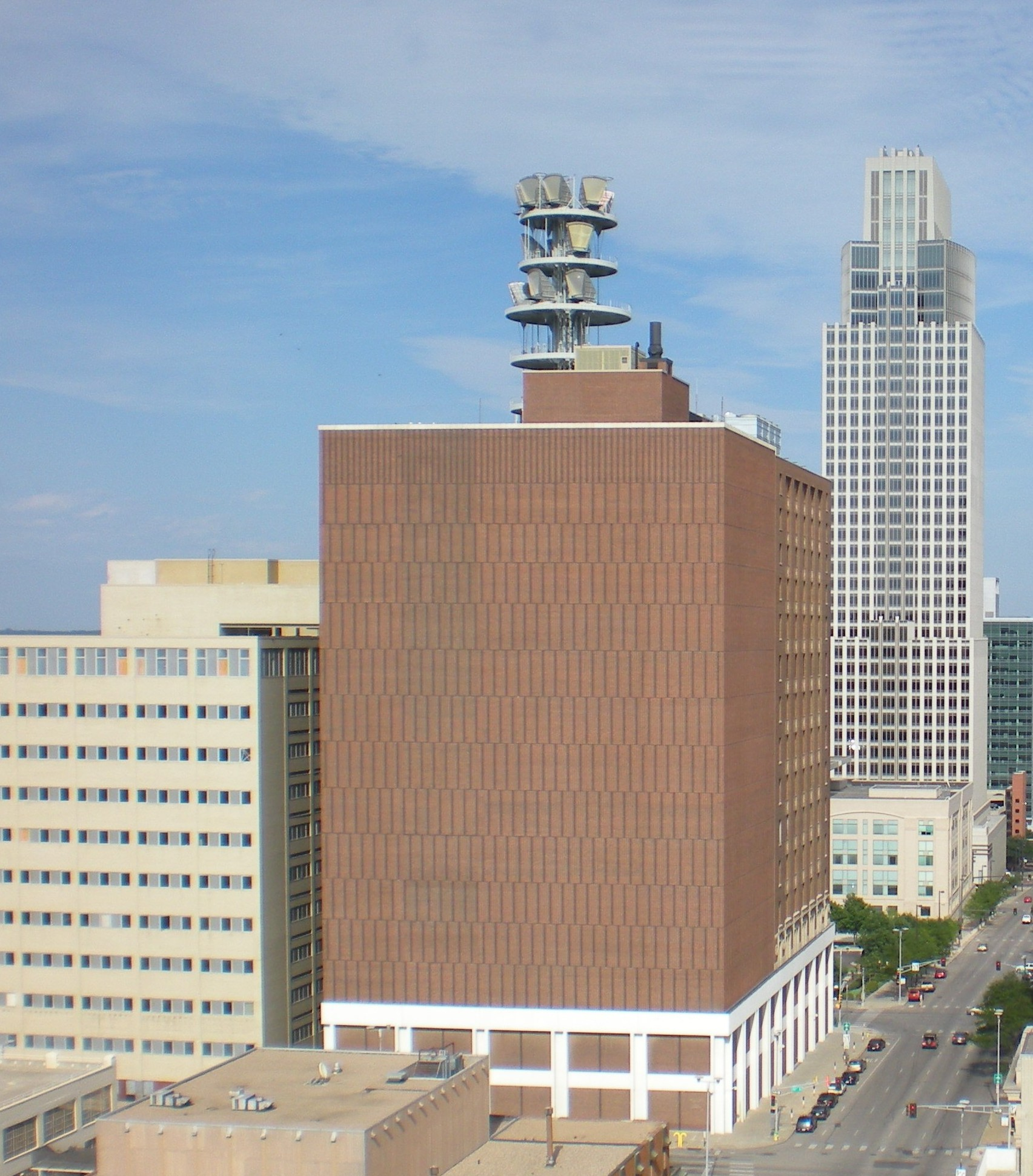
- The AT&T Building in 2008
- Interactive map of the AT&T Building area

General information
- Status: Completed
- Location: Omaha, Nebraska, U.S.
- Coordinates: 41.2589847°N 95.9417211°W
- Completed: 1918; 1968 (west addition)

Height
- Height: 334 ft (102 m)
- Roof: 265 ft (81 m)

Technical details
- Floor count: 16

Other information
- Public transit: Metro Transit
- Northwestern Bell Telephone Company Regional Headquarters
- U.S. National Register of Historic Places
- Location: Omaha, Nebraska
- Coordinates: 41.259486677668065°N 95.94170188731309°W
- Built: 1957; 1962–1964
- Architect: Leo A. Daly
- Architectural style: Modern Movement
- NRHP reference No.: 09000526
- Added to NRHP: July 17, 2009

The AT&T Building, historically known as the Nebraska Telephone Building and the Northwestern Bell Telephone Company Regional Headquarters, is a 334-foot (102 m), 16-story high-rise building in Downtown Omaha, Nebraska, United States. The north addition was added to the National Register of Historic Places on July 17, 2009. The building now houses apartments. The building to the south is now used for Lumen's Omaha operations. The original 15-story building was built in 1918 for the Nebraska Telephone Company. A 12-story addition was built in 1957 to the north, later being expanded in 1964. In 1968, an addition to the west was built. It was the headquarters of Northwestern Bell until 1981, when the company moved to the current Omaha World-Herald Building.

== History ==
The AT&T Building in Downtown Omaha was originally known as the Nebraska Telephone Building. Construction for the building began in March 1917. The building was built by Lanquist & Illsley of Chicago. The Nebraska Telephone Building officially opened in 1918. Three years later, in 1921, the Nebraska Telephone Company and several other companies merged to create Northwestern Bell, and the new company used the building as its headquarters.

The white building to the north was built and opened in 1957. On July 11, 1962, it was announced that the northern building would be expanded to fill the entire block. Construction began later that year and the addition was topped out in April 1963. The addition opened in 1964. In January 1967, a 15-story addition to the west of the building was announced. The addition was built by Hawkins Construction company. During construction of the addition, Northwestern Bell employees went on strike outside of the building. The building was completed in October 1968.

In 1981, Northwestern Bell completed and moved into its new headquarters in the current Omaha World-Herald Building. In 1991, Northwestern Bell was merged into its parent company, US West.

The building to the north was listed on the National Register of Historic Places on July 17, 2009. In 2013, that same building was converted into apartments.

== See also ==
- Economy of Omaha, Nebraska
- List of tallest buildings in Omaha, Nebraska
