= Blackstone Plaza =

High-rise office building in Omaha, Nebraska, United States

Coordinates: 41.2574°N 95.9656°W

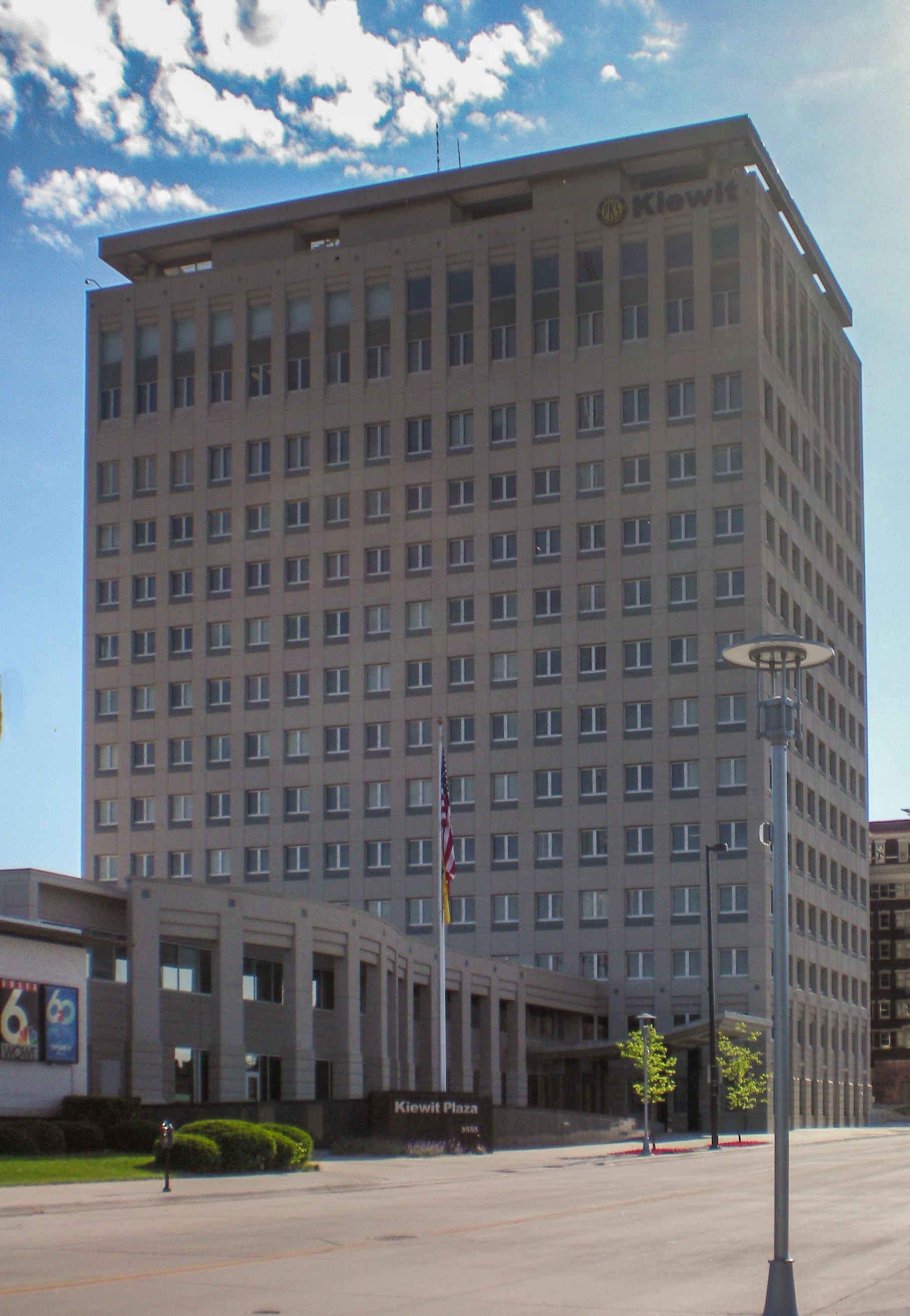
- Blackstone (then Kiewit) Plaza in 2010. The building has since been repainted black.
- Interactive map of the Blackstone Plaza area
- Former names: Kiewit Plaza

General information
- Type: Skyscraper
- Location: 3555 Farnam Street, Omaha, Nebraska, United States
- Construction started: 1960
- Completed: 1961

Height
- Height: 210 ft (64 m)

Technical details
- Floor count: 15

Other information
- Public transit: Metro Transit

Blackstone Plaza (formerly named Kiewit Plaza) is a 210-foot-tall (64.0 m), 15-story high-rise office building in Omaha, Nebraska, United States. It is located at 3555 Farnam Street at the corner of South 36th Street, built from 1960 to 1961 in the modernist architectural style. It has been the headquarters of Berkshire Hathaway since 1962, when Warren Buffett consolidated his six partnerships into one in this building.

== History ==
Blackstone Plaza was officially announced in 1959 as Kiewit Plaza and was developed to be the headquarters of Kiewit Corporation. It was originally designed to be 12 stories tall and was located on the site between the former WOWT building and the Blackstone Hotel. Construction began the following year, and design plans changed to add an additional 3 floors. Kiewit Plaza officially opened in 1961. Kiewit Plaza also became the headquarters of Berkshire Hathaway that same year.

Kiewit Plaza was purchased by Blackstone Plaza LLC on October 15, 2019 during redevelopments in the Blackstone neighborhood of Omaha. Kiewit Corporation moved its headquarters to North Downtown Omaha in 2022. Renovations to the building began in 2020, with the Kiewit signage being removed, and the building being re-branded to Blackstone Plaza. Blackstone Plaza's facade was also painted black to match the name. Since 2022, the building is home to WOWT Channel 6. Out of Berkshire Hathaway's nearly 400,000 employees, only 27 were employed at Blackstone Plaza as of the end of 2024.
