= Central Park Plaza =

Office complex in Omaha, Nebraska, U.S.

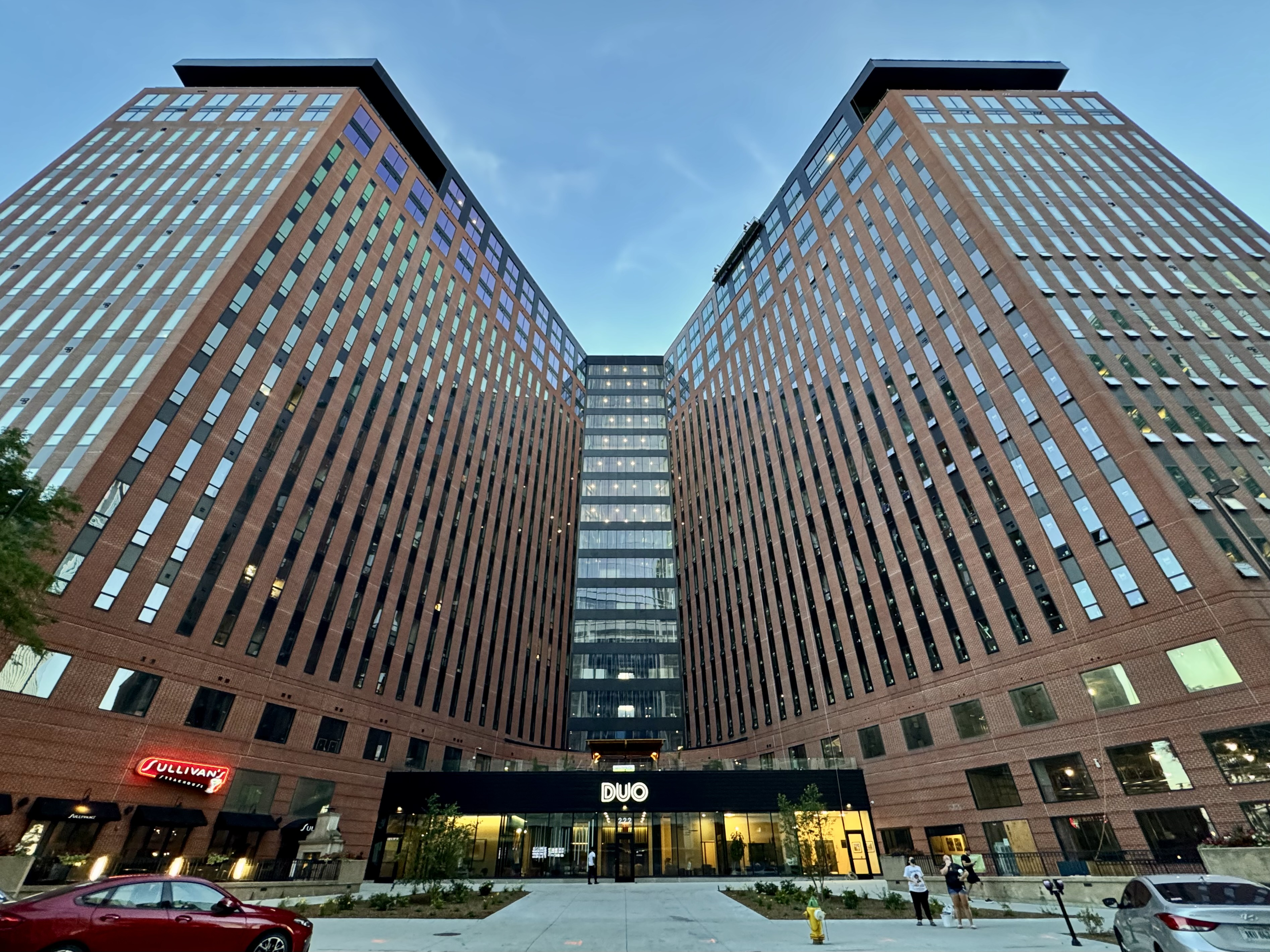
- Central Park Plaza in 2026
- Interactive map of the Central Park Plaza area

General information
- Status: under renovation
- Type: Commercial Office
- Location: 222 S. 15th Street, Omaha, Nebraska, U.S.
- Coordinates: 41.258169°N 95.936090°W
- Construction started: 1979
- Completed: 1982
- Renovated: 2024–2027

Height
- Roof: 213 feet (65 m)

Technical details
- Floor count: 15
- Floor area: 419,679 square feet (38,989.5 m^{2})

Other information
- Public transit: Metro Transit

Central Park Plaza is a 15-story commercial office complex in Downtown Omaha, Nebraska, United States. The complex consists 419,679 square feet (38,989.5 m^{2}) of office space, in two red brick towers with a lower level center connector on the first and second floors. The building features a central courtyard and a six-story parking garage that is located directly north of the building and is connected by a skywalk. In 2007 a "sunrise" lighting feature was added to the angled face of the towers. The towers, built in a "V" formation, have been central to Omaha's skyline since they were built in the 1980s. Central Park Plaza is currently being redeveloped into apartments known as the Duo.

== History ==
Originally built in 1982, the buildings housed the corporate headquarters for Conagra until the company began to move to their new riverfront campus in 1988, and they had completely vacated the buildings by 1990. Over the years the buildings have housed offices for several corporations important to Omaha's economic history including; First National Bank of Omaha, US West, OPPD, Norwest Bank, and the Norchem division of Enron.

In 1983, in an attempt to revitalize retail along 16th Street in downtown, a two-story mall, Parkfair Mall, was added to the west side of Central Park Plaza, across from the J. L. Brandeis and Sons Store Building. The mall closed in the early 1990s and in 2005 the current owners of the building converted the mall into a 125-stall, heated parking facility.

After several corporations relocated their offices to other facilities during the late 1990s and early 2000s, the building's vacancy rate soared as high as 73%. In 2005 FirstComp Insurance company relocated their headquarters to the south tower and after several renovations now occupy the majority of the north tower. Also in 2005 the first Starbucks in Downtown Omaha opened in a location on the first floor of the north tower. The first floor of the south tower has an upscale steakhouse, Sullivan's, that opened in 2007. Both locations had outdoor patios in the courtyard added during a $500,000 restoration to the main courtyard in 2005.

In November 2021, an additional third tower was announced for the site. Additionally, internal renovations were also planned. These plans were later cancelled. In March 2024, a $163 million redevelopment project for the block was announced. Redevelopment includes demolition of the mall, and replacing it with parking and additional apartment space, and combining the two towers into a single building. Additionally, the name of Central Park Plaza will be changed to, "The Duo". Construction began later that year and is expected to be completed in 2027.

== Architecture ==
Central Park Plaza primarily consists of two 213 foot (65 m)-tall towers, both of which have a brick and glass facade. Both towers are in a V-shape formation. Originally built as commercial high-rises, the towers were originally connected by a two story brick-built junction near the bottom of both towers. Prior to renovations in 2024, the complex also had the Park Fair Mall, which was later converted into a heated parking garage. Following 2024 renovations, both towers are directly connected to the top-most floors. Additionally a twelve story high-rise building is located on the site of the former mall.

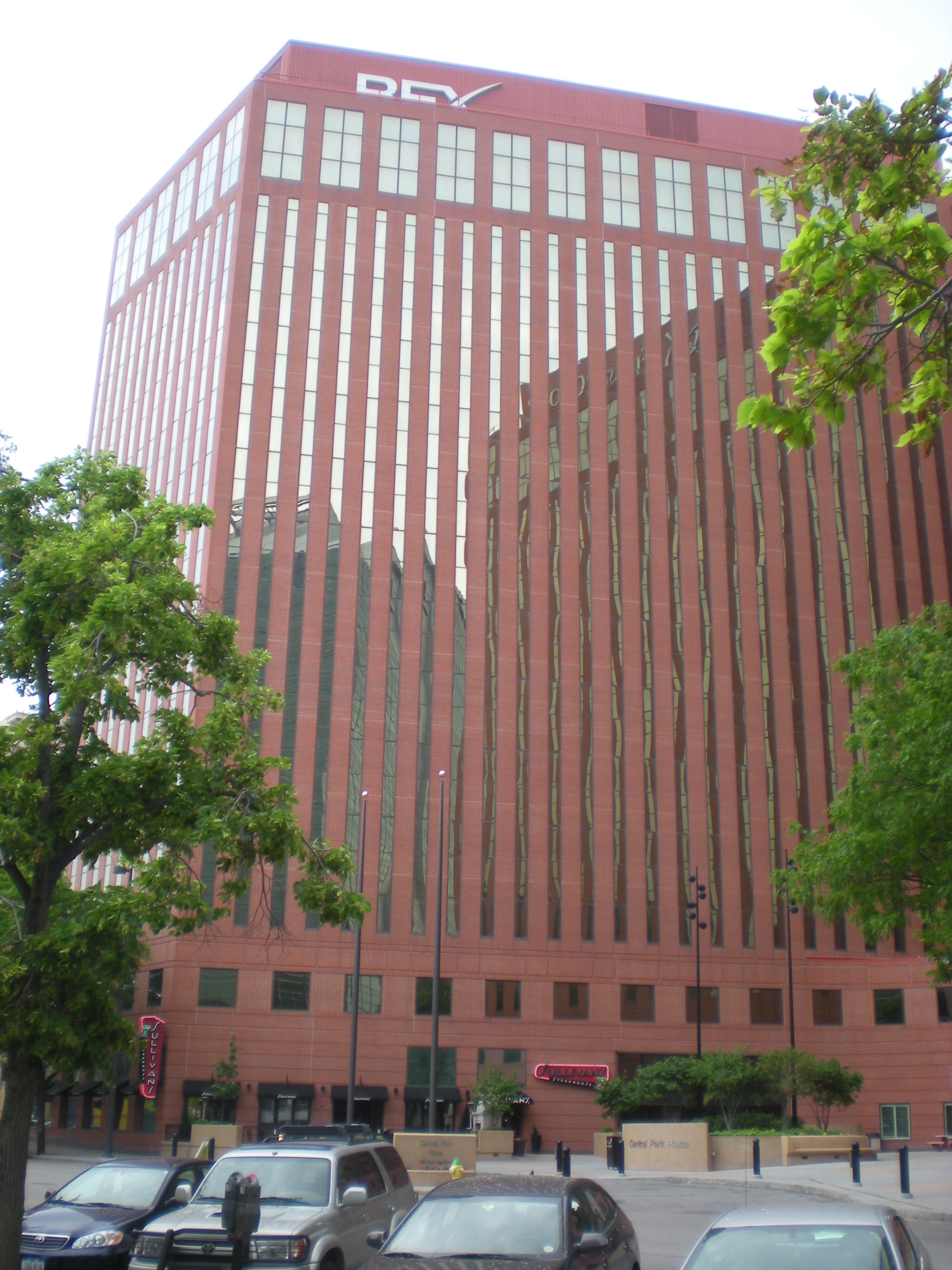
Central Park Plaza South Tower

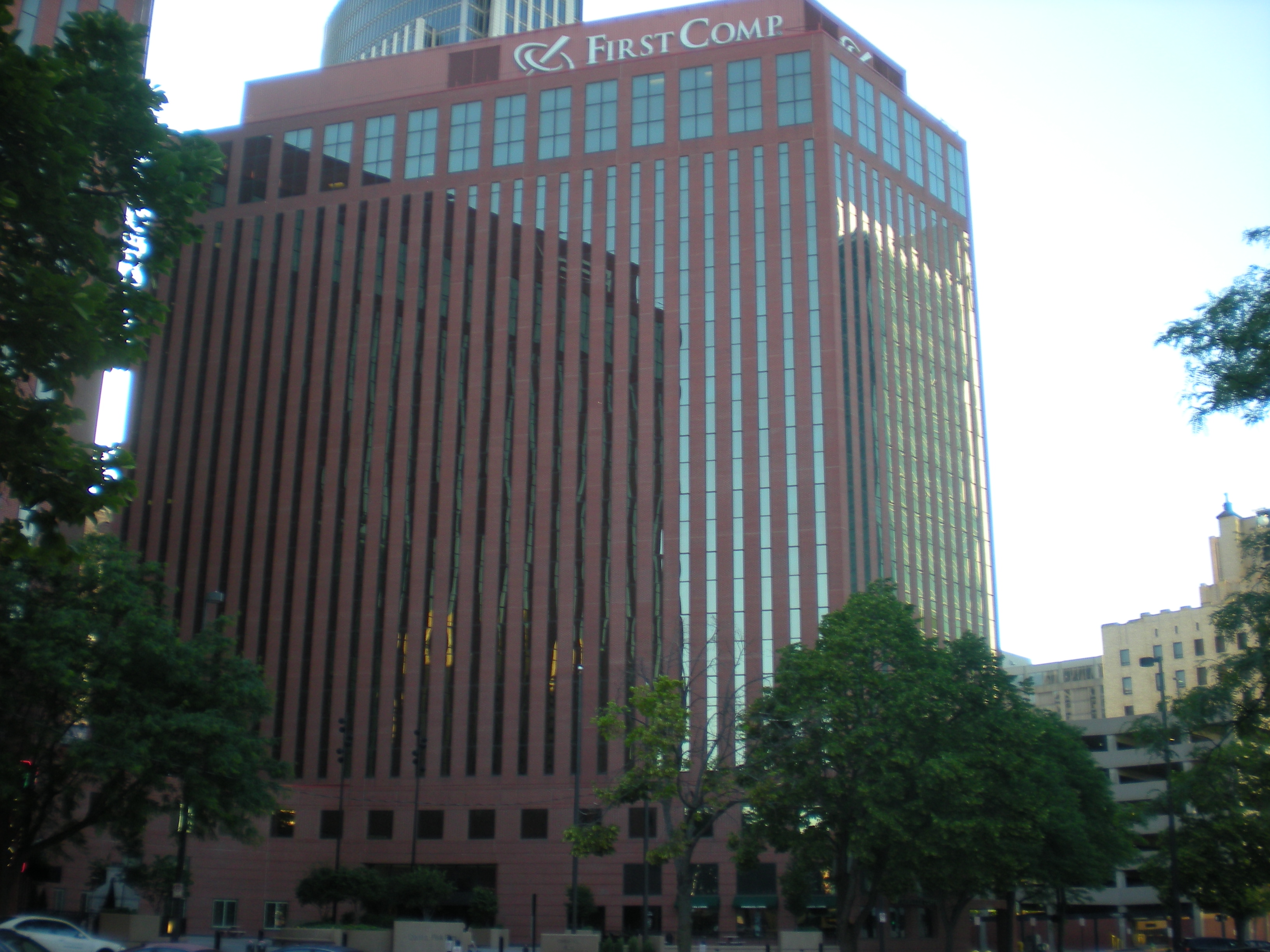
Central Park Plaza North Tower

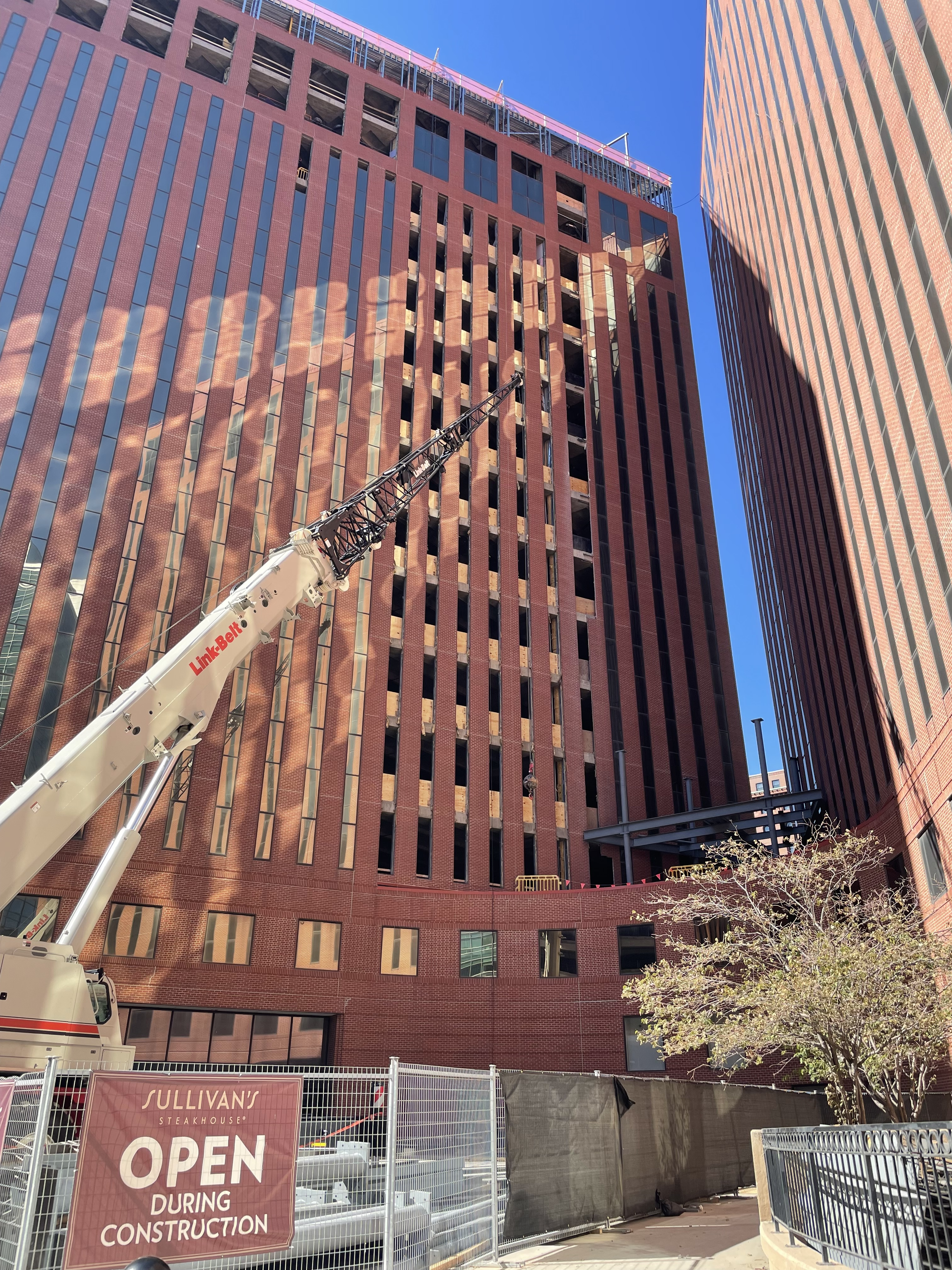
South Tower under renovation in 2024

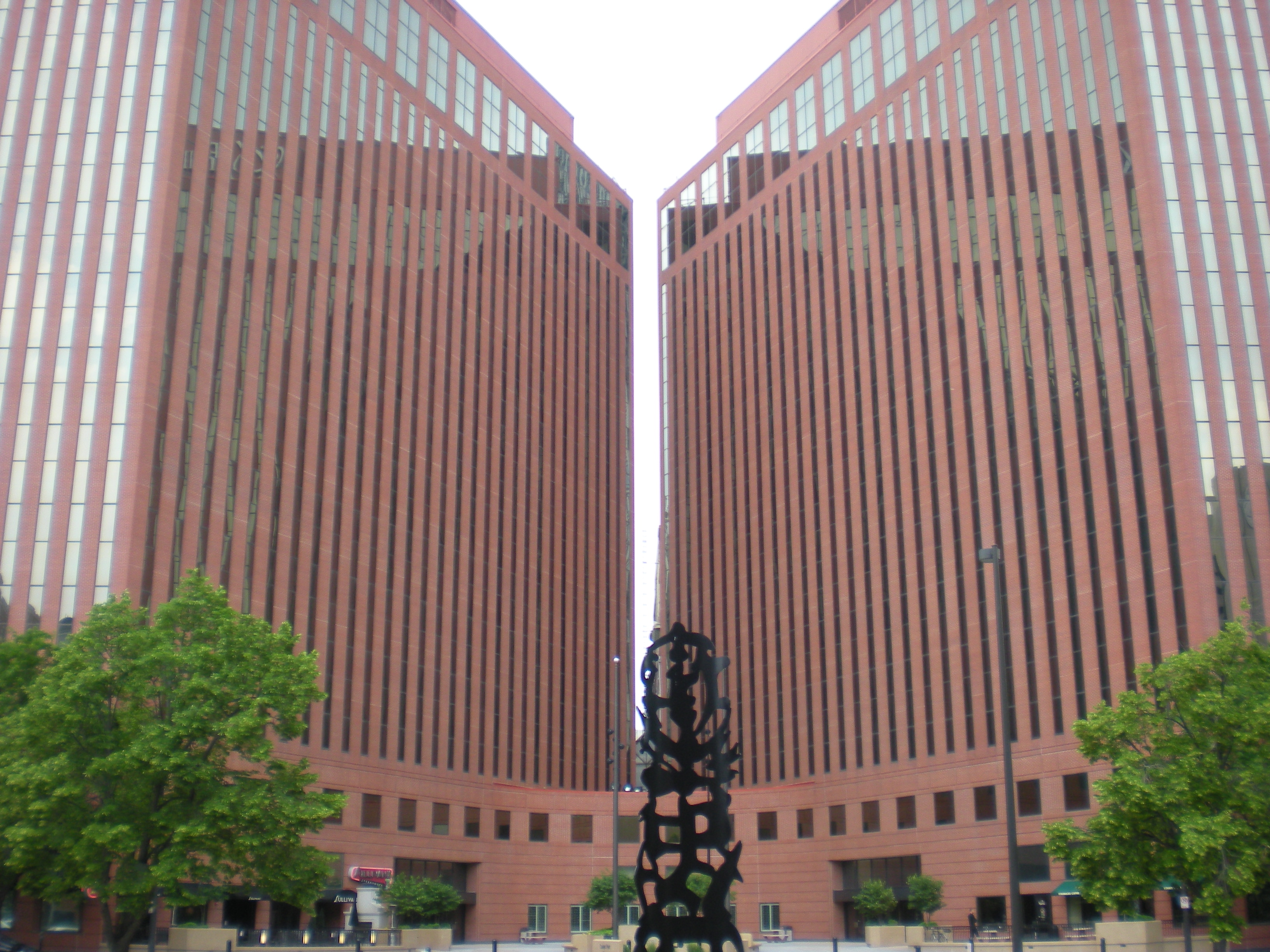
Central Park Plaza in 2010
