= RiverFront Place Condos =

Coordinates: 41°16′01″N 95°55′29″W

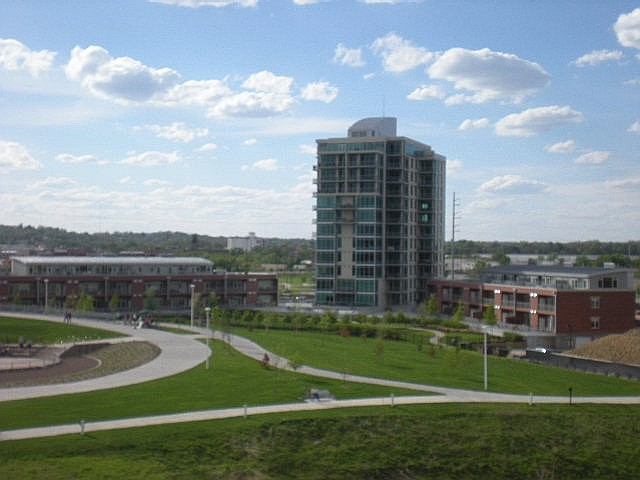
- Tower I and town homes as seen from the Bob Kerrey Pedestrian Bridge
- Interactive map of the RiverFront Place Condos area

General information
- Status: Partially Complete
- Type: Residential
- Location: 555 Riverfront Plaza, Omaha, NE
- Construction started: 2006

Technical details
- Floor count: 12 & 15

Other information
- Public transit access: Metro Transit

RiverFront Place Condos is a new condo development located along the riverfront in Downtown Omaha, Nebraska. It consists of two condo towers anchored by two rows of town homes. Tower one, completed in 2006, is 12 stories tall and holds 36 units. Tower two began construction in 2009 and is 15 stories tall. There are 18 contemporary town homes that were completed in 2006. The development features a large green space and is adjacent to the Bob Kerrey Pedestrian Bridge and Gallup University Campus.
