= Woodmen of the World Building (Omaha, Nebraska) =

Former high-rise in Omaha, Nebraska U.S.

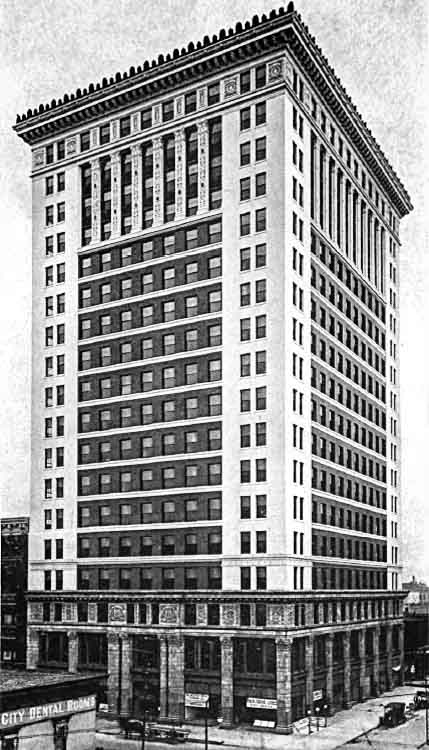
- The Woodmen of the World Building shortly after completion in 1912
- Interactive map of the Woodmen of the World Building area

General information
- Status: Demolished
- Type: Commercial office
- Architectural style: Italian Renaissance
- Location: 1323 Farnam Street, Omaha, Nebraska, U.S.
- Coordinates: 41.257124396750875°N 95.93388209597722°W
- Completed: 1912
- Demolished: December 18, 1977
- Cost: $1,500,000

Height
- Height: 242 ft (73.8 m)

Technical details
- Floor count: 19

Design and construction
- Architecture firm: Holabird & Roche, Fisher and Lawrie

The Woodmen of the World Building was a commercial high-rise building located at 1323 Farnam Street, Omaha, Nebraska, United States. Built in 1912, the building was the headquarters of Woodmen of the World from its opening until 1934, when it relocated to the Insurance Building. The building was closed in 1976 and was imploded on December 18, 1977.

== History ==
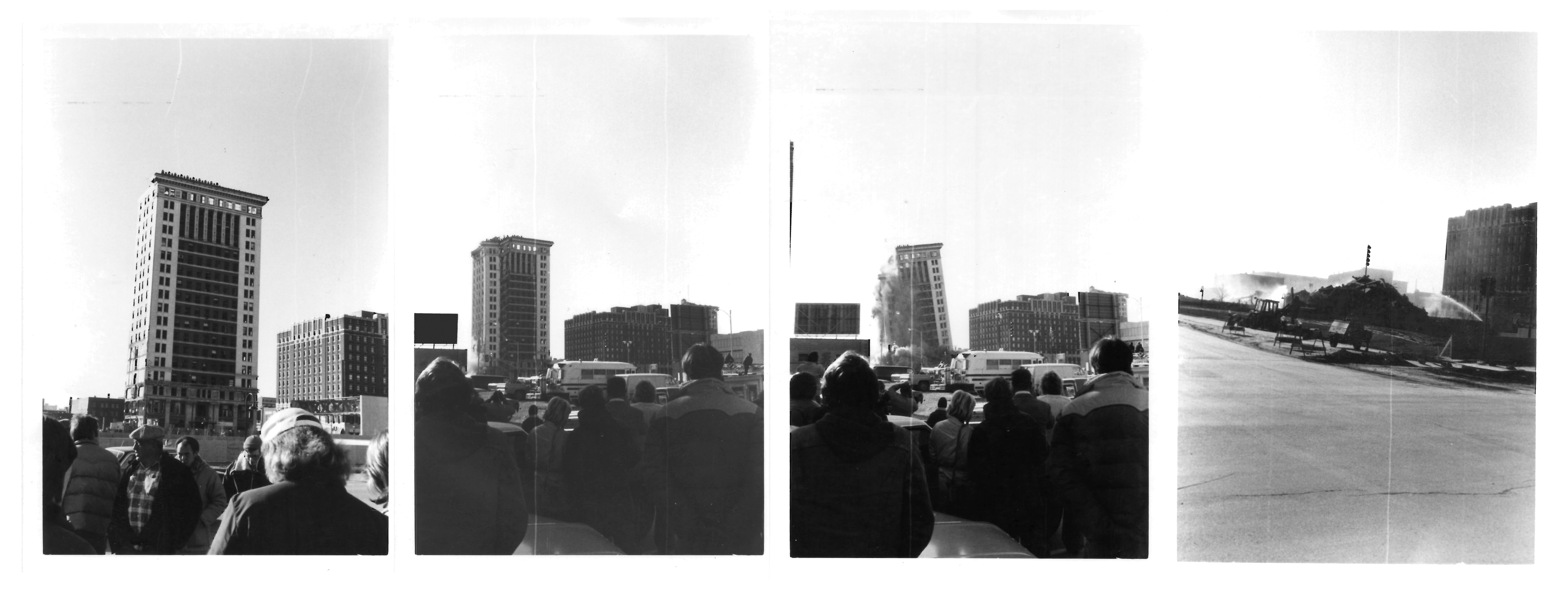
Demolition of the Woodmen of the World Building at 14th and Farnam Streets, 1977

The Woodmen of the World Building was announced in June 1909, following twelve years of planning. It would be built for Woodmen of the World for use as its headquarters. In January 1911, plans were officially unveiled for the building. The building was originally designed to be 18 stories tall, and have an estimated height of 220 feet (67 m). Construction began later that same year, and the building was officially dedicated in October 1912.

Woodmen of the World later vacated the building in 1934, moving its headquarters to the Bee Building, then known as the Insurance Building. In 1976, the final owner of the building, Peterson Brothers Realty Co., announced that the building would be closed and would be subsequently demolished. Several lawsuits were issued to prevent the demolition of both Woodmen of the World Building, and several other properties razed in 1977. However, it was ruled that federal courts had no authority to prevent their demolition. The building was imploded on December 18, 1977.

== Architecture ==
The Woodmen of the World Building was designed by Holabird & Roche and Fisher and Lawrie architects. The building was built using the Italian Renaissance style of architecture and featured exterior decorations of pink granite and terracotta. The building was 242 feet (74 m) tall and had 19 stories. It included a motor operated revolving door opening into a lobby with a 30-foot-high (9.1 m) ceiling. Six elevators carried tenants to the upper floors.

== See also ==
- List of tallest buildings in Omaha, Nebraska
- Yule marble
