= 1200 Landmark Center =

Building in Omaha, Nebraska, U.S.

Landmark Center
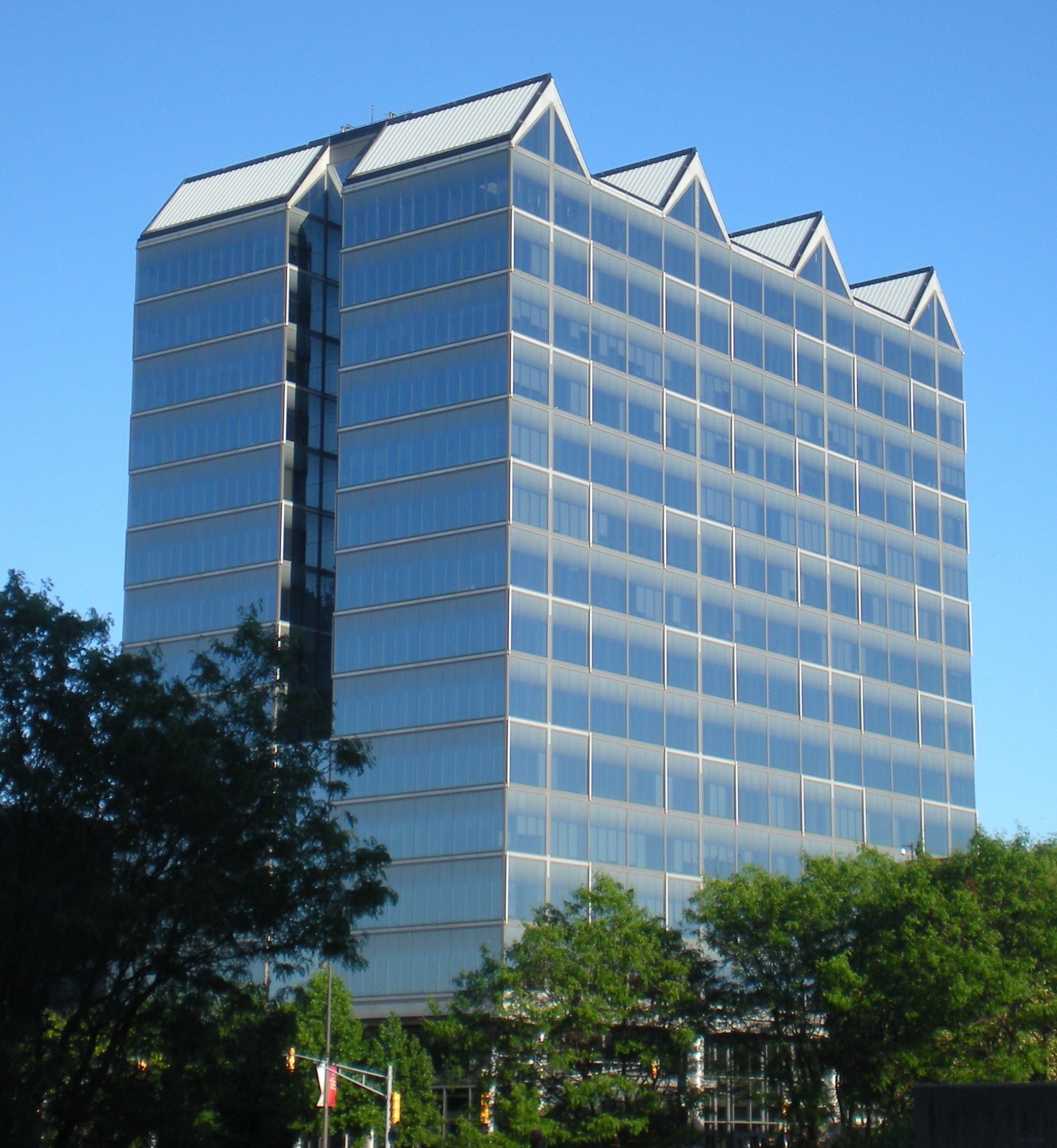
- The Farnam Hotel in 2010
- Interactive map of the Landmark Center area

General information
- Status: Completed
- Location: Omaha, Nebraska, U.S.
- Coordinates: 41.2574°N 95.9319°W
- Completed: 1990

Height
- Roof: 255 ft (78 m)

Design and construction
- Architects: Holabird & Root

Other information
- Public transit access: Metro Transit

Website
- www.regus.com/en-us/united-states/nebraska/omaha/landmark-center-2525

Landmark Center is a building complex that contains a 255 ft (78 m), 15-story high-rise building and data center. It is located at the corner of South 13th and Farnam Streets in Downtown Omaha, Nebraska, United States. Landmark Center was built in 1990 by BetaWest Properties Inc. for Northwestern Bell and was previously known as 1200 Landmark Center. The high-rise portion of the complex was converted into a hotel, which opened on May 20, 2021.

== History ==
In February 1988, it was announced that BetaWest Properties Inc. would be building a twelve-story tall building and an additional four story building for Northwestern Bell. The month after, it was announced that an entire block of the Old Market would be demolished to make way for the building. This included the Dewey and Stone Building, which was built in 1876. The building was the oldest commercial structure in Downtown Omaha and had its facade preserved.

Demolition of the buildings on site was halted in October 1988 after many demolition vehicles were damaged, causing many employee's to leave Omaha. However, work commenced two days later after labor pact allowed the plan to resume. Construction began that same month after a majority of the buildings on site were razed. By 1989, the plan changed to a 15-story high-rise building, a 480-stall parking garage, and a five story data center.

1200 Landmark Center officially opened in February 1991. After the completion of 1200 Landmark Center, US West announced that it would leave the real-estate market and would be selling the data center portion of the building. They would sell the data center to Phillip Morris Capital and would then lease it.

The high-rise portion of the complex was renovated into a hotel, which opened in May 2021.

== Design ==
1200 Landmark Center is a building complex that contains a 15-story high-rise building, a five-story data center, and a parking garage. The high-rise portion of the complex is 255 (78 m) tall. The building was designed by Holabird & Root. The data center and high-rise portions of the building portray a blue glass facade. Occupying a two block area, the complex is in an area formerly belonging to the Old Market.

== See also ==
- Economy of Omaha, Nebraska
- List of tallest buildings in Omaha, Nebraska
