= List of tallest buildings in Lincoln, Nebraska =

Skyline of Lincoln
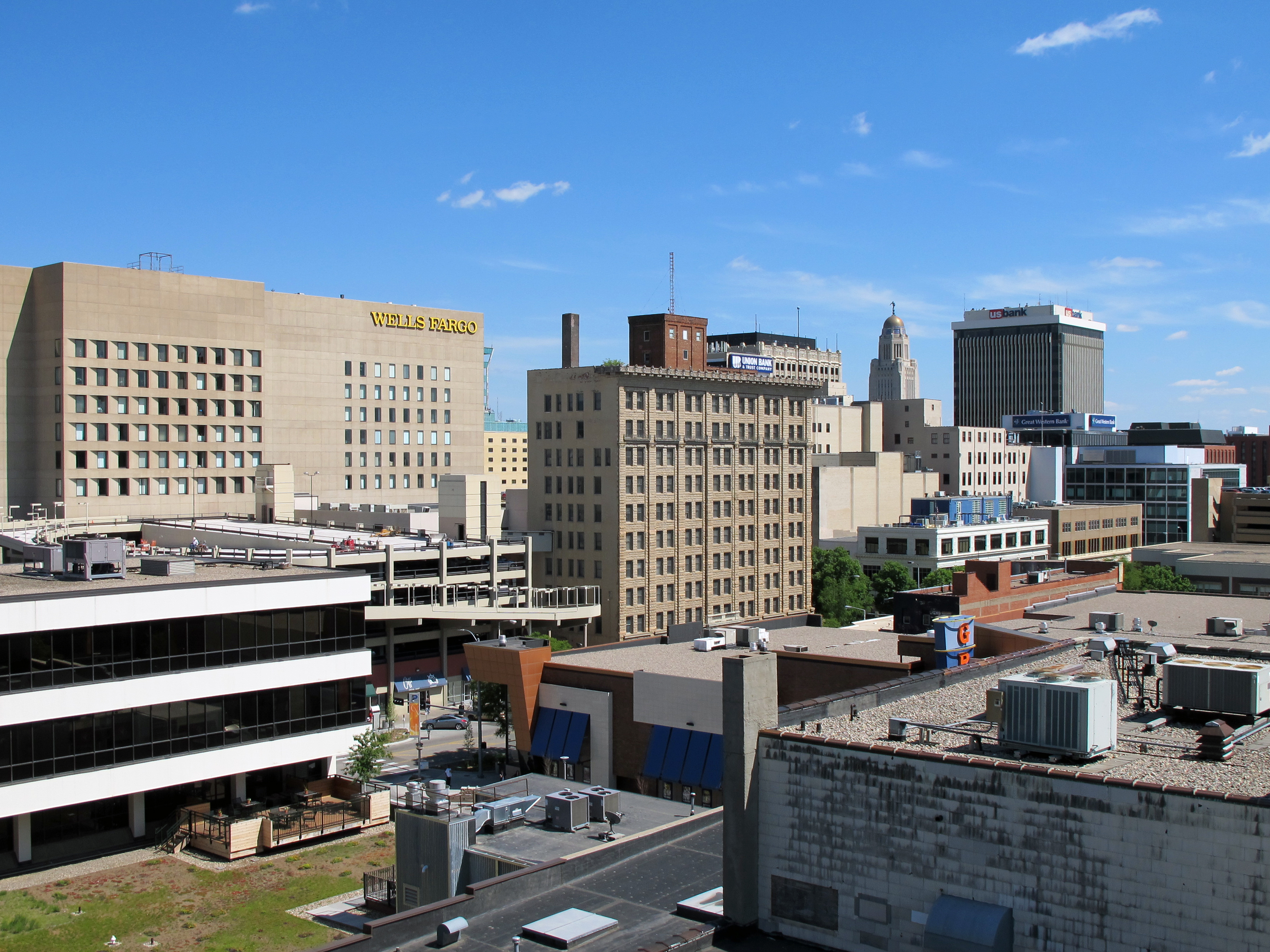
- The skyline of Lincoln in 2015
- Tallest building: Nebraska State Capitol
- Tallest building height: 398 ft (121 m)

Number of tall buildings
- 20 stories or more: 2
- Taller than 75 m (246 ft): 3
- Taller than 100 m (328 ft): 1

Number of tall buildings — feet
- Taller than 200 ft (61.0 m): 3
- Taller than 300 ft (91.4 m): 1

Lincoln is the state capital and 2nd-largest city in the U.S. state of Nebraska, it also is the county seat of Lancaster County. The city has a population of 305,010 people as of February 2026. The city has 10 high-rises that stand over 150 ft (46 m) tall. As of February 2026, the tallest building in Lincoln is the 398 ft (121 m) tall Nebraska State Capitol, which was built in 1932.

The most recently completed high-rise is the 254 ft (77 m) tall Lied Place Residences, which was built in 2022.

== History ==
The history of high-rises in Lincoln started in the late 1910s with the completion of the 150 ft (46 m) tall Terminal Building in 1917, which became the tallest building in the city upon its completion. In the late 1920s, a building boom occurred, leading to the construction of the 166 ft (51 m) tall Sharp Tower, which surpassed the Terminal Building as the tallest building in Lincoln. In 1932, the 398 ft (121 m) tall Nebraska State Capitol was built, which surpassed the Sharp Tower as the tallest building in Lincoln, it also became the tallest building in Nebraska until 1969, when it was surpassed by the WoodmenLife Tower in Omaha. The city experienced a second building in the 1970s, leading to the construction of the 220 ft (67 m) tall U.S. Bank Building in 1970, which became the second tallest building in Lincoln. The city would not see any new high-rises being constructed until 2022, when the 254 ft (77 m) tall Lied Place Residences was built, which surpassed the U.S. Bank Building as the second tallest building in Lincoln.

== Map of tallest buildings ==
The map below shows the locations of the buildings in Lincoln that stand over 150 ft (46 m) in height. Each marker is given a number based on the buildings ranking in the list. The color of each marker represents the decade that the building was completed in.

Buildings in Lincoln that stand over 150 ft (46 m).
- 1950s and before
- 1960s
- 1970s
- 1980s
- 1990s
- 2000s
- 2010s
- 2020s
1 Nebraska State Capitol
2 Lied Place Residences
3 U.S. Bank Building
4 Union Bank Place
5 Graduate by Hilton Lincoln
6 Sharp Tower
7 Oldfather Hall
8 University Towers
9 Georgian Place
10 Terminal Building

== Tallest buildings ==
This list ranks buildings in Lincoln that stand at least 150 ft (46 m) tall. Spires and other architectural details are included in the height of a building, however, antennas are excluded.

Tallest building in Lincoln upon completion

Rank	Name	Image	Location	Height	Floors	Year	Purpose	Notes	References
1	Nebraska State Capitol	Lincoln_Monument,_Nebraska_State_Capitol,_13th_Street,_Lincoln,_NE_-_53709335061	40°48′29″N 96°41′59″W	398 ft (121 m)	22	1932	Government	Tallest building in Lincoln since 1932. Tallest building in Nebraska from 1932 until the completion of the WoodmenLife Tower in 1969.	
2	Lied Place Residences	Lied_Place_Residences_October_2025	40°48′56″N 96°42′18″W	254 ft (77 m)	22	2022	Residential, Office	Designed by Smallwood, Reynolds, Stewart, Stewart.	
3	U.S. Bank Building	US_Bank_Tower,_13th_Street_and_M_Street,_Lincoln,_NE	40°48′42″N 96°42′11″W	220 ft (67 m)	19	1970	Office		
4	Union Bank Place	Wells Fargo Center Skyline of Downtown Lincoln, Nebraska, U.S. (2015) (cropped)	40°48′51″N 96°42′11″W	173 ft (53 m)	12	1976	Office		
5	Graduate by Hilton Lincoln	Holiday_Inn_-_panoramio_-_Masrur_Odinaev	40°48′52″N 96°42′32″W	169 ft (52 m)	16	1974	Hotel	Formerly known as the Holiday Inn Lincoln - Downtown.	
6	Sharp Tower	Sharp Tower View from Nebraska State Capitol 2025a (cropped)	40°48′44″N 96°42′08″W	166 ft (51 m)	15	1926	Office	Tallest building in Lincoln from 1926 to 1932.	
7	Oldfather Hall	Oldfather Hall View from Nebraska State Capitol 2025a (cropped)	40°49′11″N 96°42′12″W	163 ft (50 m)	12	1970	Education		
8	University Towers	Stuart Bldg (Lincoln, Nebraska) from NW 2	40°48′52″N 96°42′08″W	158 ft (48 m)	13	1929	Residential	Formerly known as the Stuart Building.	
9	Georgian Place	Hotel Capital (Lincoln, Nebraska) from NE 1	40°48′52″N 96°42′21″W	152 ft (46 m)	11	1926	Residential		
10	Terminal Building	Untitled - panoramio - dahusker (1)	40°48′48″N 96°42′26″W	150 ft (46 m)	10	1917	Office	Tallest building in Lincoln from 1917 to 1926.	

== Timeline of tallest buildings ==
Name	Image	Years as tallest	Height	Floors
Terminal Building	Terminal Building (Lincoln, Nebraska) from NE 1	1917-1926	150 ft (46 m)	10
Sharp Tower	Sharp_Tower_View_from_Nebraska_State_Capitol_2025a_(cropped)	1926-1932	166 ft (51 m)	15
Nebraska State Capitol	Nebraska_State_Capitol,_K_Street,_Lincoln,_NE_-_53709664829	1932-Present	398 ft (121 m)	22

== See also ==
- List of tallest buildings in Omaha
- List of tallest buildings in Nebraska
- List of tallest buildings in Wichita
- List of tallest buildings in Cedar Rapids
- List of tallest buildings in the Quad Cities
- List of tallest buildings in Little Rock
