= Keller Group =

British ground engineering company

Keller Group plc
- Formerly: Chidworth Limited (1989–1990)
- Company type: Public limited company
- Traded as: LSE: KLR; FTSE 250 component
- Industry: Ground engineering
- Founded: 1860; 166 years ago
- Headquarters: London, England
- Key people: Carl-Peter Forster (Chair); James Wroath (CEO); David Burke (CFO)
- Revenue: ▲£3,087.3 million (2025)
- Operating income: ▲£218.2 million (2025)
- Net income: ▲£143.1 million (2025)
- Number of employees: 10,000 (2026)
- Subsidiaries: Cyntech; GEO-Instruments; Suncoast Post-Tension; Moretrench Industrial; Phi Group
- Website: keller.com

Keller Group plc (LSE: KLR) is a geotechnical engineering company. It is listed on the London Stock Exchange and is a constituent of the FTSE 250 Index. The company is the world's largest geotechnical specialist contractor.

== History ==
The company was established in the 1950s as the ground engineering division of GKN plc. In 1960, it expanded into a stand-alone piling and ground improvement company and, in 1975, it acquired the German company Johann Keller and took on that name. In 1984, Keller bought Hayward Baker Inc., a US ground engineering business. In 1990, it was the subject of a management buy-out from GKN plc supported by Candover. During May 1994, the company was listed on the London Stock Exchange for the first time; three months later, it was awarded a £7.5 million contract for a German customer; at the time, it was the company's largest single order. In early 1995, Keller Group announced it has recorded £9.4 million in pre-tax profits, a 33 percent rise over the previous year; this was in part attributed to deals made in the North American market.

In 1997, Keller Group's fiscal performance dipped somewhat, which was attributed to external factors such as the strengthening of the Sterling and an economic downturn in Germany. Six months later, profits rose to £13.8 million, which was up 10 percent from the previous year; a large portion of these gains were from its international projects. During 1998, the company elected to expand its British-based concrete repair subsidiary Makers, as well as acquire the Australian foundation specialist Franki for £3.5 million. In August 1999, Keller Group stated that two-thirds of its pre-tax profits were derived from Makers.

Throughout the early 2000s, the American market would be a consistent source of profits for the company. During 2003, Keller Groups underwent restructuring, which included 50 job losses, due to overcapacity and industry-wide changes; profits declined sharply by 46 percent while its subsidiary Makers was marked down by £7 million. However, by the start of 2005, Makers had returned to profitability and Keller Group was once again considering its expansion.

During 2006, Keller Group acquired Anderson Drilling, the creators and owners of the Big Stan drilling rig, along with several British specialist firms, amid stronger than expected fiscal results. In September 2007, the company sold its social housing division for nominal consideration; later that same year, the company acquired the American piling specialist HJ Foundation in exchange for £24.5 million.

During 2008, Keller Group was impacted by the start of the Great Recession and a major downturn in the housing market; in an effort to reduce its dependence upon the US market, it turned towards other markets, such as India and eastern Europe. One year later, the company achieved over £1 billion in turnover for the first time.

In 2011, it was awarded contracts worth £30 million for grouting, structural monitoring and surveying works on London's Crossrail programme. Two years later, Keller Group doubled its profits, which its management was attributed to its international growth.

During 2015, the company's performance dipped due to a downturn in Australia; while lower revenues were recorded for that year, profits actually rose. Nevertheless, in 2018, Keller Group issued a profit warning and dropped out of the FTSE 250 Index.

In January 2023, Keller Group published a profit warning after a "deliberate and sophisticated financial reporting fraud" at Austral Construction. The estimated impact was £6m related to the first half of 2022, and £8m to £10m relating to prior years. Two directors were dismissed as investigations continued, and the company's shares fell 10%. The fraud was described by The Times as "apparently sophisticated". Keller's pre-tax profit for 2022 fell by 17% as a result; it made £56m profit across the year, from a turnover of £2.9bn.

In June 2025, Keller announced CEO Michael Speakman would leave in August 2025 for medical reasons, and would be succeeded by James Wroath, a former CEO of logistics firm Wincanton. In 2024, Keller revenues grew 1% to £2.98bn with pre-tax profit up 46% to £184m, and operating profit up 34% to £205m.

== Operations ==
Keller operates under three divisions and is supported by its group head office:

- North America: Bencor, Case Foundation, Hayward Baker, HJ Foundation, Keller Canada, McKinney Drilling, Suncoast, Moretrench. With effect from 1 January 2020, these businesses were all branded as Keller and operate as regional parts of a single company.
- Europe, Middle East and Africa: Central Europe, North-East Europe, North-West Europe, South-East Europe, Franki, French Speaking Countries, Middle East, Iberia and Latin America, Brazil
- Asia-Pacific: ASEAN, India, Keller Australia and Austral Construction.

The company has been involved in laying foundations for complex projects including High Speed 2 in the UK and the Spirit Tower in Australia.

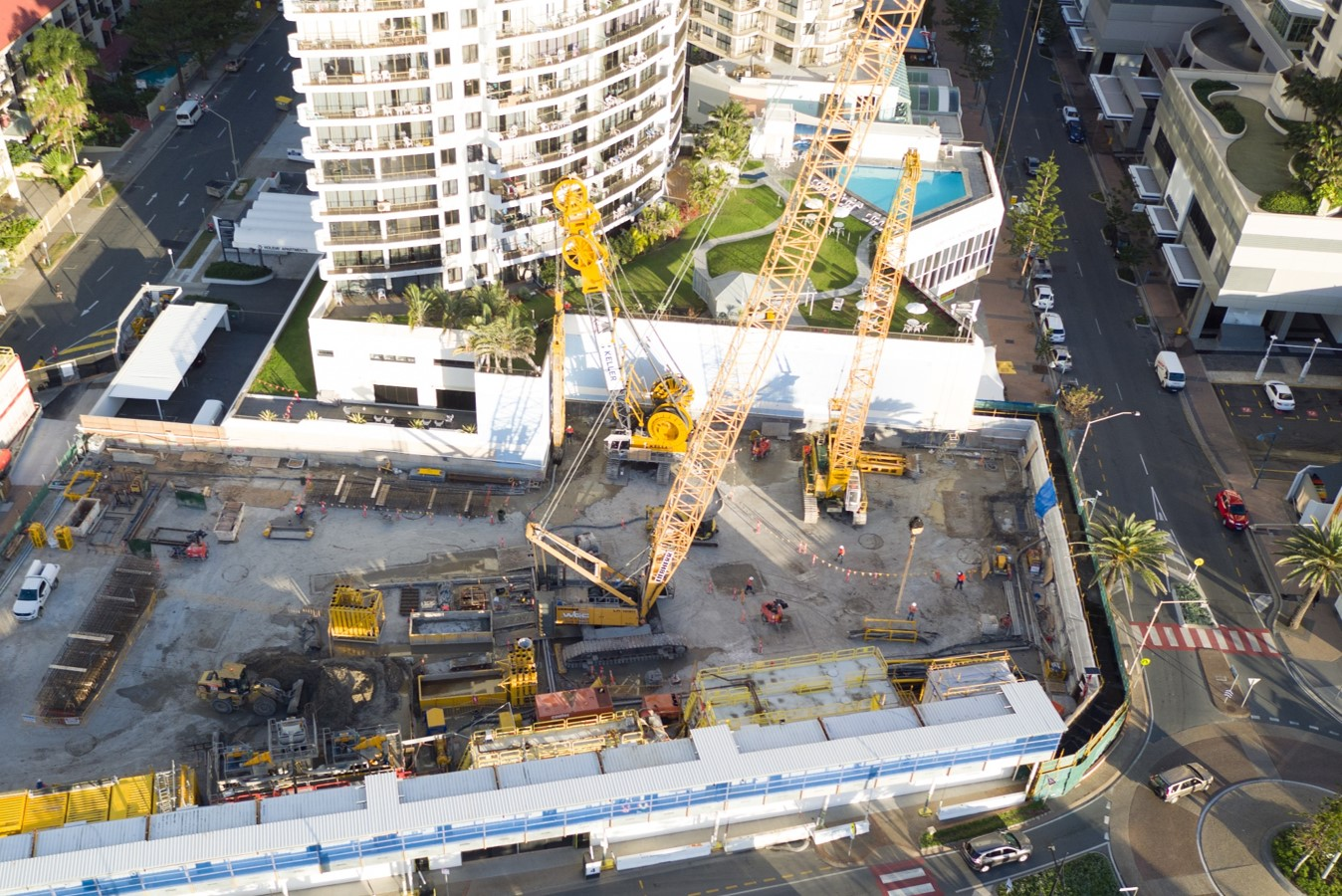
Keller lays foundations for the Spirit Tower, one of Australia's tallest buildings

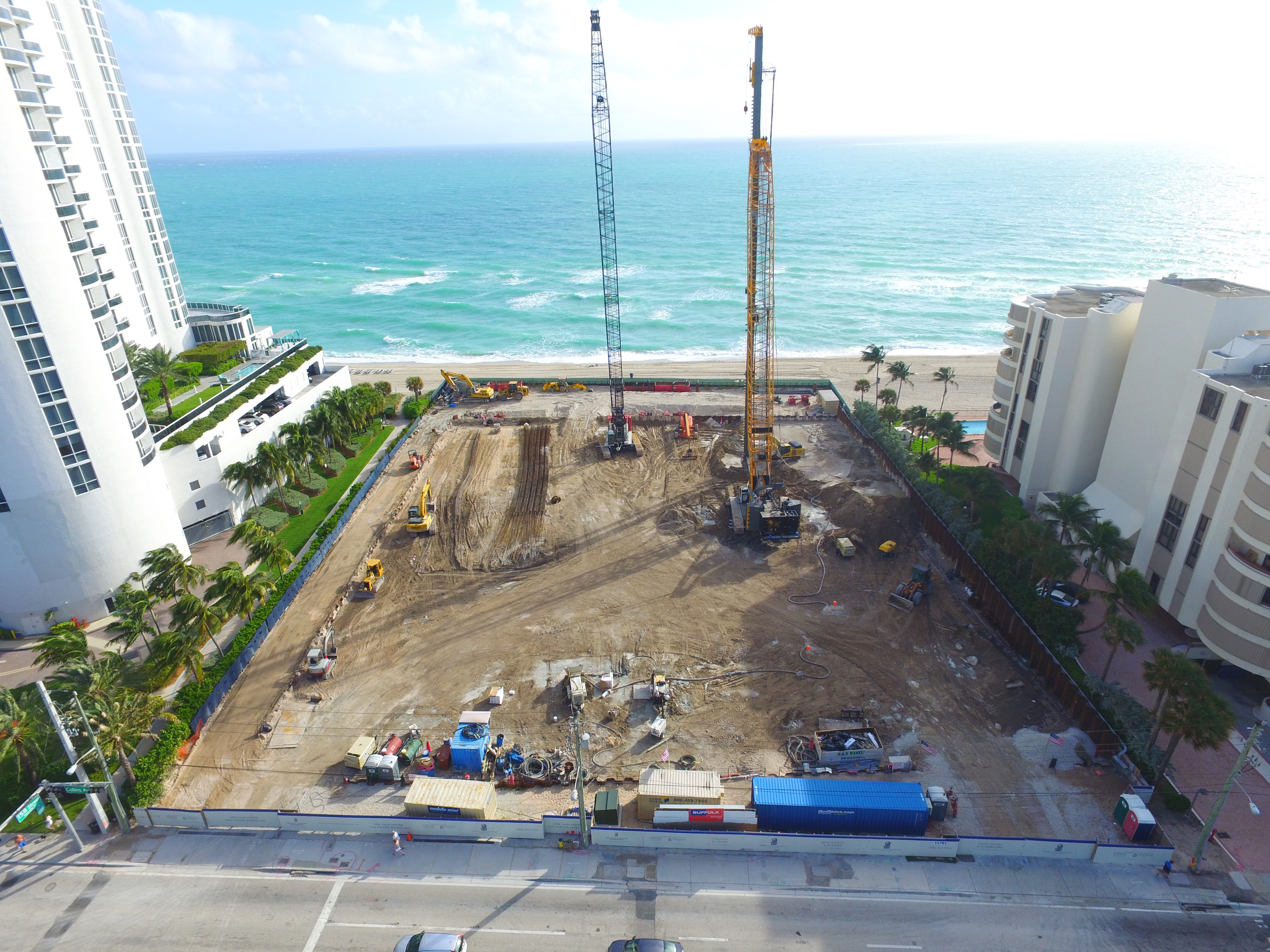
Keller completes foundation for luxury apartments - Miami

== See also ==
- British Geotechnical Association
