= WoodmenLife =

Fraternal life insurance company

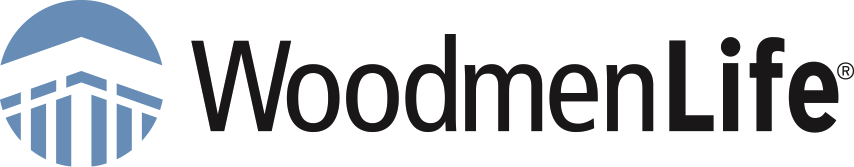

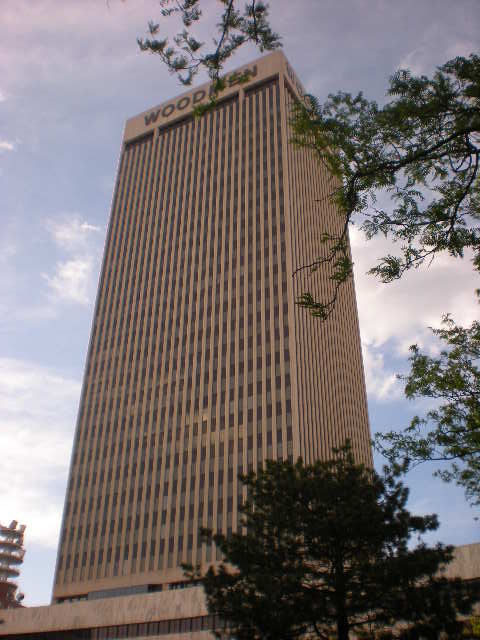
- WoodmenLife Tower in Omaha, Nebraska
- Formerly: Woodmen of the World
- Type: Private
- Industry: Insurance
- Founded: June 6, 1890; 136 years ago, in Omaha, Nebraska
- Founder: Joseph Cullen Root
- Headquarters: Woodmen Tower; 1700 Farnam Street, Omaha, Nebraska, United States
- Area served: United States
- Key people: Denise M. McCauley (chairman and CEO); Wilbur Jenkins (COO); Jon R. Aerni (CFO)
- Operating income: US$1 billion (2025)
- Total assets: ▲US$11.3 billion (2025)
- Rating: A+
- Website: www.woodmenlife.org

Woodmen of the World Life Insurance Society, doing business as WoodmenLife, is a not-for-profit fraternal benefit society founded in 1890, based in Omaha, Nebraska, United States, that operates a large privately held insurance company for its members.

The history of the organization includes numerous philanthropic efforts and community outreach projects; distinctive headstones depicting tree stumps across the United States and Canada before 1930, a program to present American flags, and broadcast interests that owned the first television station where Johnny Carson worked.

== History ==
The organization was founded in 1890 in Omaha, Nebraska, by Joseph Cullen Root. Root founded Modern Woodmen of America (MWA) in Lyons, Iowa, in 1883, after hearing a sermon about "pioneer woodsmen clearing away the forest to provide for their families". Taking his own surname to heart, he wanted to start a society that "would clear away problems of financial security for its members".

After internal dissension within the MWA, Root was ejected from the organization that he had founded. When moving to Omaha, Root decided to start again with a new group he called the Modern Woodmen of the World. He soon dropped the "Modern", and the organization became "Woodmen of the World".

Woodmen of the World began marketing itself as WoodmenLife on June 1, 2015.

=== Mergers ===
Over the years a number of smaller fraternal organizations have been absorbed into WoodmenLife, including the United Order of the Golden Cross (a temperance movement association founded by J. H. Morgan) in 1962, the benefits operation of the Order of Railroad Telegraphers in 1962, and the New England Order of Protection in 1969.

The Woodmen of the World had a female auxiliary called the Woodmen Circles from the early 1890s. Its local units were called local "Groves" and they were governed by a "Supreme Forest", subject to the Sovereign Camp of the Woodmen of the World. The Circle eventually reached 130,000 members, but it was absorbed by the Woodmen in 1965.

During the Woodmen Circle convention of 1897, delegates from nine western states declared their intention to leave the national organization. They formed a new organization called the "Pacific Circle, Women of Woodcraft". It changed its name to the Neighbors of Woodcraft in 1917, but it merged with the Woodmen of the World in July 2001.

The first Boys of Woodcraft unit was founded in Jacksonville, Florida, in 1903, by J.M. Taylor. In 1979, the Boys of Woodcraft Sportsmen's Clubs and the Girls of Woodcraft merged into the Woodmen Rangers and Rangerettes. This youth affiliate had 115,471 members in 1979.

In the current constitution youth affiliates are called Youth Chapters which are affiliated to adult Chapters.

=== Buildings ===
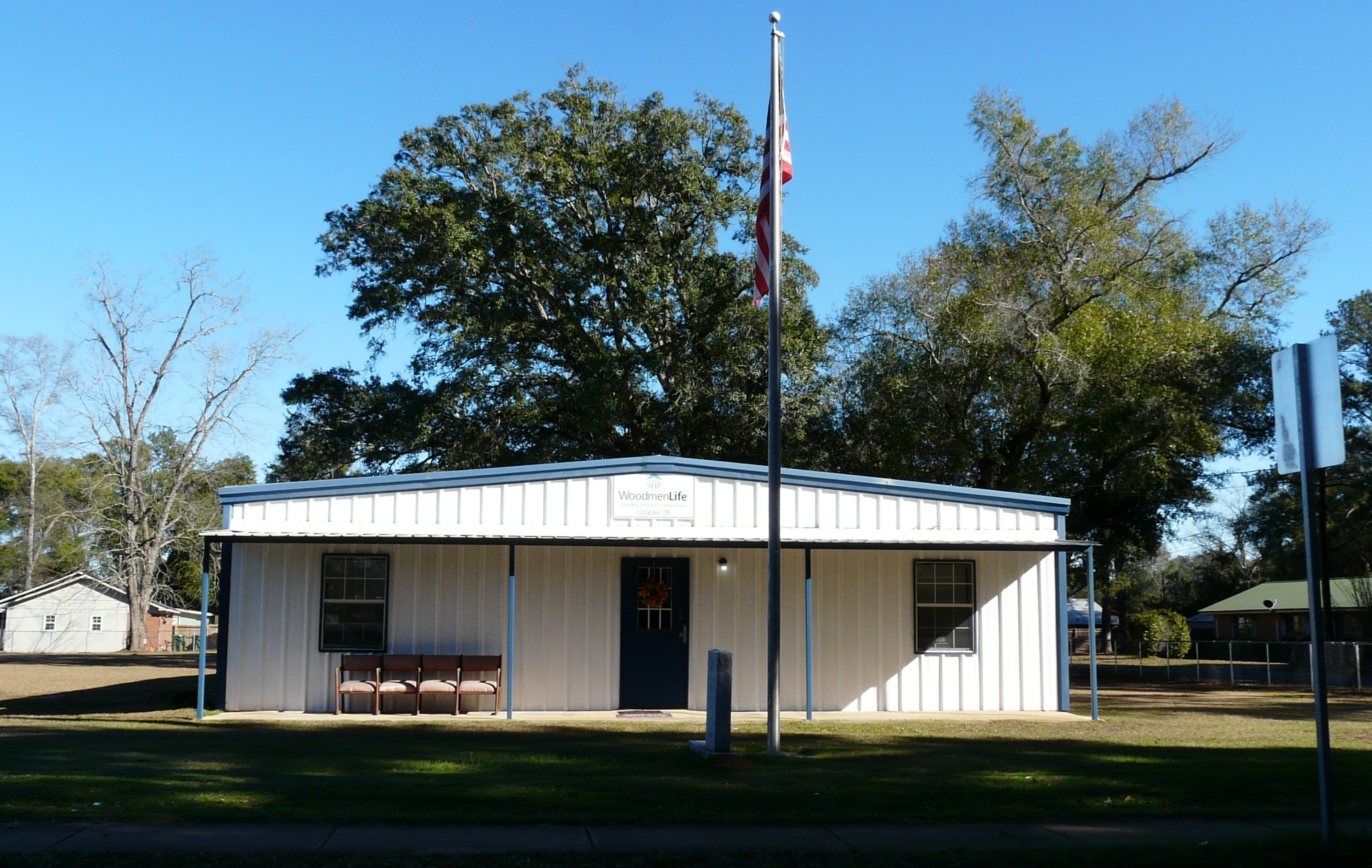
Chapter in Bainbridge, Georgia

The organization used to own a 19-story tower at 14th and Farnam streets in Omaha, Nebraska, which was the tallest building between Chicago and the West Coast at the time of its dedication in 1912. WOW built its current 30-story Woodmen Tower in 1969. It was Nebraska's tallest building until the completion of the 45-story First National Bank Tower in 2002.

The original WOW building was demolished in 1977.

=== Broadcasting ===
The organization played an important role in broadcast history, inaugurating broadcasting service on November 27, 1922, on its radio station WOAW, with a signal that reached ships in the Atlantic and Pacific Oceans from its 500-watt (later 1,000 watt, and eventually 5,000 watt) transmitters. In 1926, the station became WOW after the ship SS Henry J. Bibble, which had held the call sign, was retired from service.

In 1943, the society decided to retire from broadcasting, and leased the station to a group of local investors who formed Radio Station WOW, Inc. The society assigned the FCC license to the group.

Meredith Corporation acquired the stock of the company in 1951, which by that time had placed a companion television station on the air (now WOWT). Meredith added an FM station in 1961 (now KEZO-FM).

In 1999, Journal Broadcast Group changed the AM station's rare three-letter call sign to KOMJ. With a subsequent program format change in 2005, the station became KXSP. After being purchased by Walnut Radio, LLC; the callsign of the station was reverted to WOW in July 2026.

=== Headstones ===
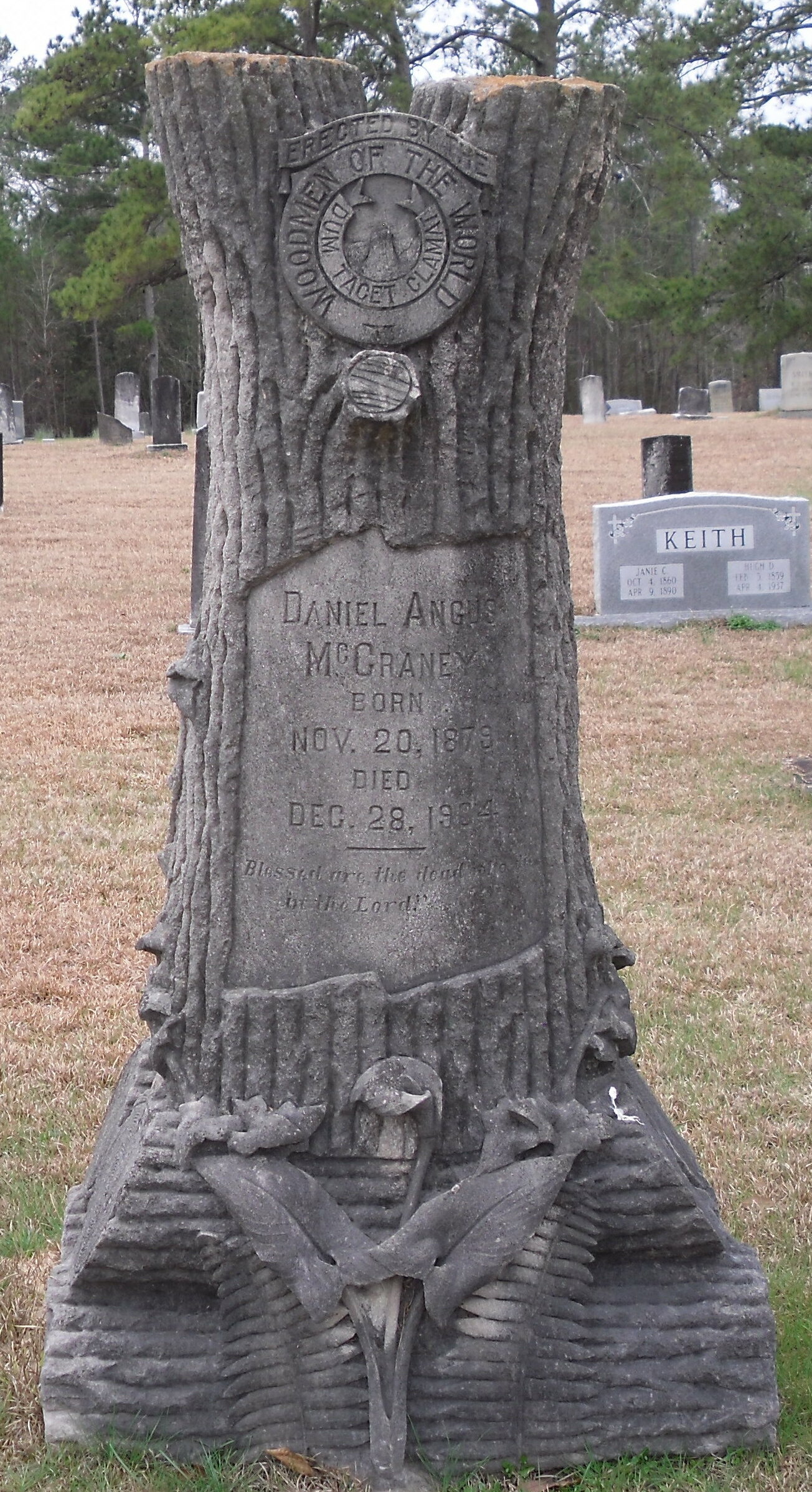
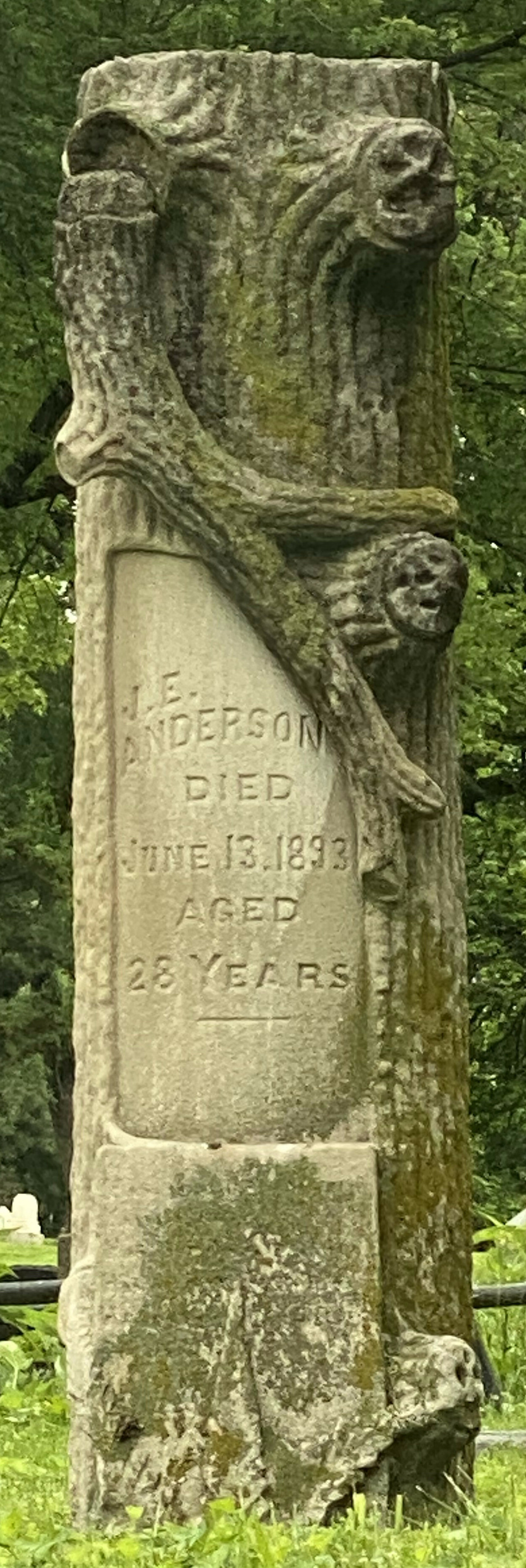
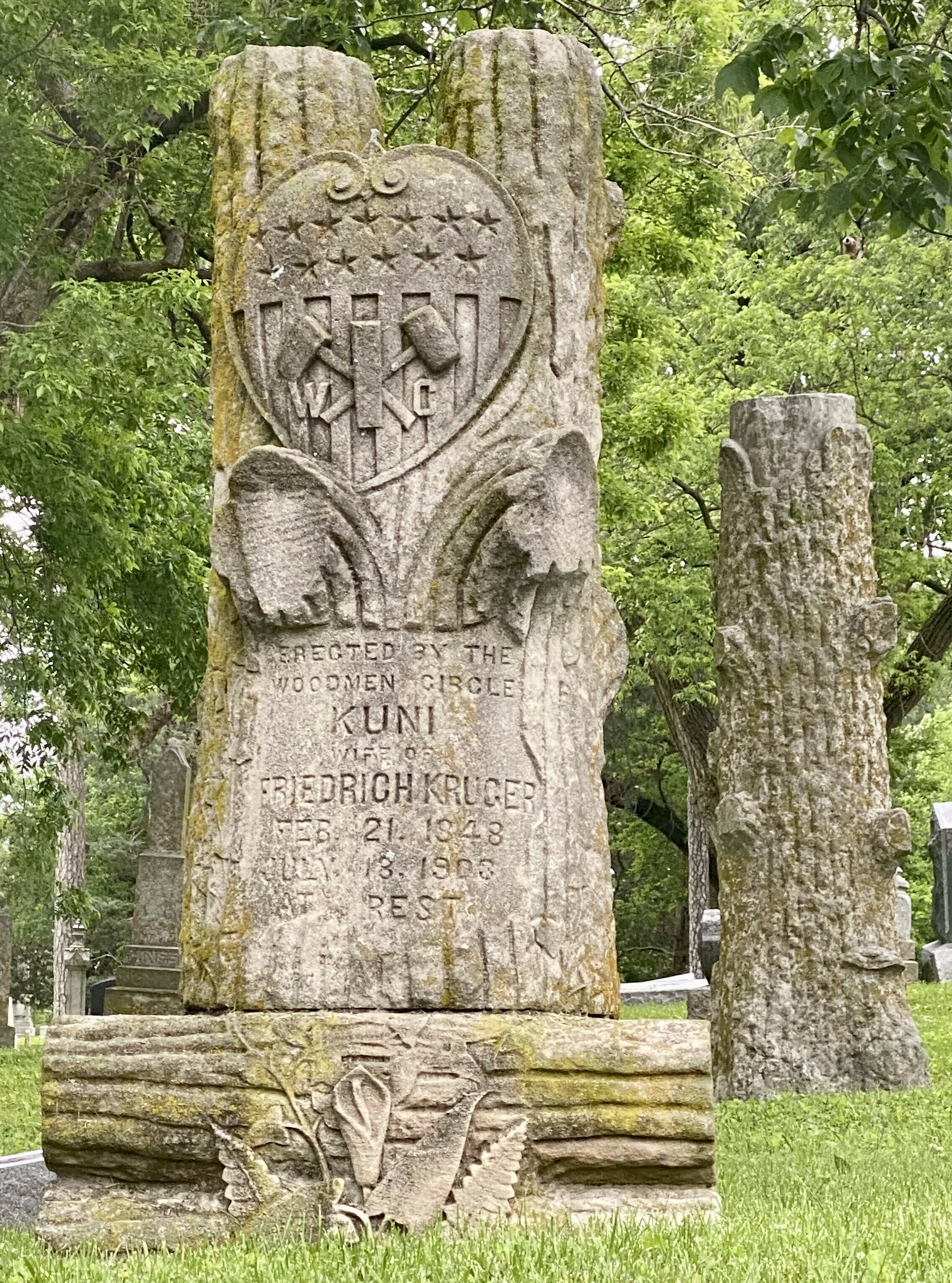

A physical legacy of the organization are "Treestones" or "tree-stump tombstones" marking the grave of a Woodman of the World. The sawed off tree limbs represent a life cut short. These headstones were used because, "until the 1920s, membership in the Woodmen of the World provided each member with a tombstone."

== Organization ==
Historically, the top of the organizational structure of WoodmenLife was the "Sovereign Camp", which met quadrennially. When the Sovereign Camp was not in session the organizations was run by a board of directors. States were called either "Jurisdictions" or "Head Camps". Local groups were called either "Camps", "Courts" or "Groves". There were 4,000 locals in 1979.

Locals are now called Chapters which are part of geographical Jurisdictions. Chapters elect delegates to the Jurisdictional Conventions held every two years who in turn elect delegates to the National Conventions which are held every four. The governing body of WoodmenLife is the National Convention. In between conventions the organization is run by a board of directors which includes the president and CEO; executive vice president; secretary and general counsel; executive vice president, chief financial officer (CFO); executive vice president, chief operating officer (COO); and up to ten additional members.

== In film ==
In the film About Schmidt (2002), Jack Nicholson plays a retired Woodmen executive actuary.

== Financial standing ==
WoodmenLife has been awarded a rating of A+, the second highest ranking out of 15, for its financial strength and operating performance by A.M. Best.

In 2025, WoodmenLife reported to have $39.4 billion of life insurance in force, and an income of $1 billion.

== See also ==
- All-Woman Supreme Court: A Texas court created to hear a Woodmen case
