= Iluka =

Iluka may refer to:

== Places ==
- Iluka, New South Wales, a town on the north coast of New South Wales in Australia
- Iluka, Western Australia, a suburb of Perth, Western Australia

== Other uses ==
- Iluka Nature Reserve in New South Wales, Australia
- Iluka Resources, an Australian mining company
- Spirit (building), also known as Iluka, a proposed building on the Gold Coast, Queensland, Australia
