= Tower Building =

Tower Building may refer to:
(sorted by state, then city/town)

- Tower Building of the Little Rock Arsenal, listed on the National Register of Historic Places (NRHP) in Pulaski County, Arkansas
- Tower Building (Little Rock, Arkansas), listed on the NRHP in Pulaski County (not the same building as the Tower Building of the Little Rock Arsenal)
- Tower Building (Washington, D.C.), listed on the NRHP in Washington, D.C.
- Ziock Building, also known as the Tower Building, Rockford, Illinois
- Tower Building (South Bend, Indiana), listed on the NRHP in St. Joseph County
- Tower Building, Liverpool, England
- Tower Building (Jackson, Mississippi), a Mississippi Landmark
- Tower Building (New York, New York)
- Tower Petroleum Building (Dallas, Texas)
- Tower Building (Richmond, Virginia)
