= First National Bank Tower =

Skyscraper in downtown Omaha, Nebraska, U.S.

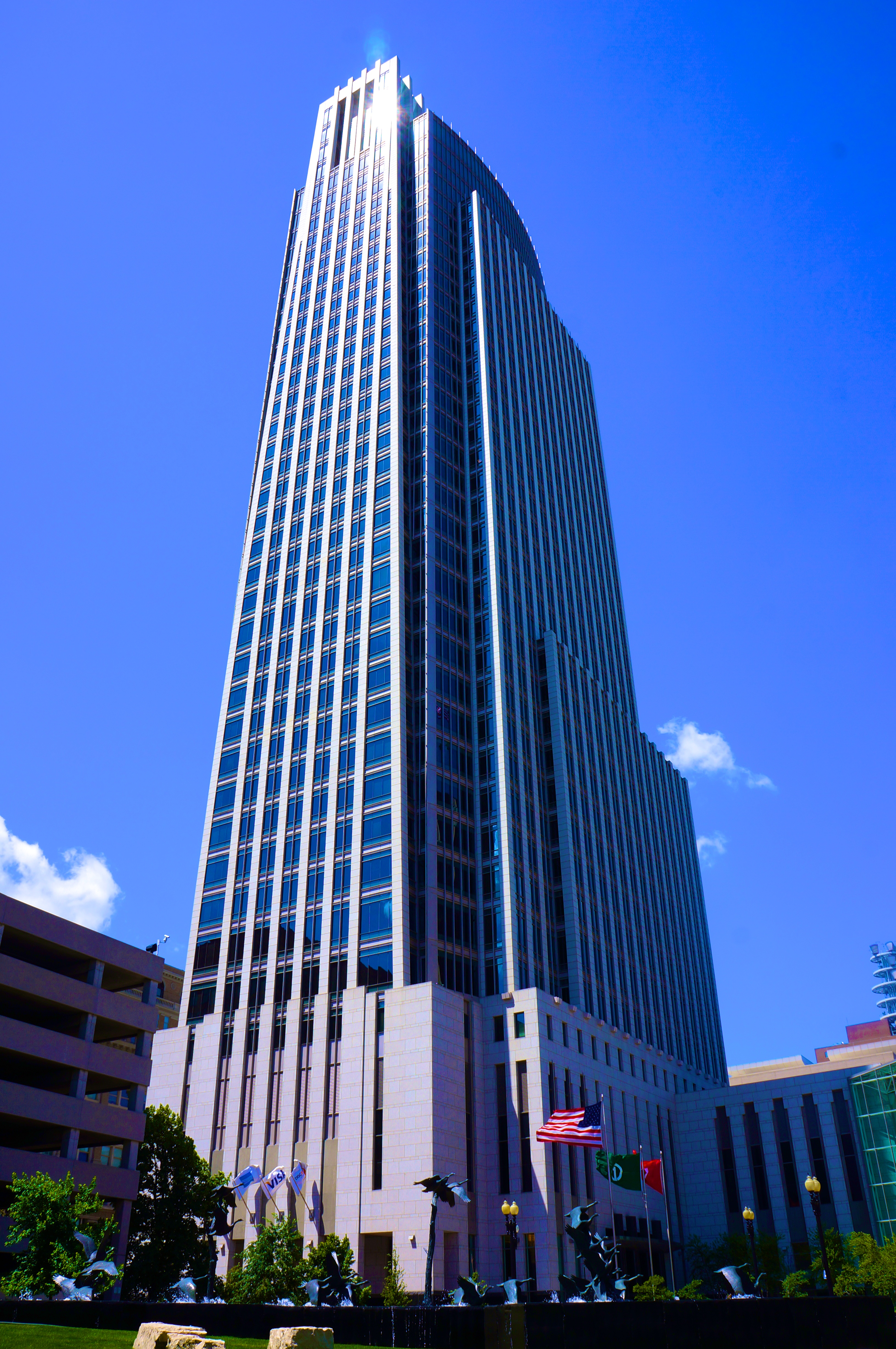
- First National Bank Tower in 2012
- Interactive map of the First National Bank Tower area

Record height
- Tallest in Nebraska from 2002 to 2026^{[I]}
- Preceded by: WoodmenLife Tower
- Surpassed by: Mutual of Omaha Headquarters Tower

General information
- Status: Completed
- Type: Commercial office
- Location: 1601 Dodge Street, Omaha, Nebraska; U.S.
- Coordinates: 41°15′33″N 95°56′16″W
- Construction started: 1999
- Completed: 2002

Height
- Roof: 634 ft (193 m)

Technical details
- Floor count: 45
- Floor area: 729,998 sq ft (67,819.0 m^{2})

Design and construction
- Architect: Leo A. Daly
- Main contractor: Kiewit Corporation

Other information
- Public transit: Metro Transit

The First National Bank Tower is an office skyscraper in Downtown Omaha, Nebraska, United States, and the official headquarters of First National Bank of Omaha. Rising to 634 feet (193 m) and 45 stories, it was the tallest building in Omaha upon completion for over twenty years, overtaking the 30-story WoodmenLife Tower located nearby. Construction began in April 1999 and lasted until 2002, with the building's completion being the subject of ACEC and Emporis awards.

The construction of the tower and its parking garage heavily utilized cast-in-place concrete. Inside, the tower features a winter garden and the original facade of the Medical Arts Building, which was torn down to make space for the First National Bank Tower.

The tower currently stands as the second-tallest building in both Omaha and the state of Nebraska, after the 677-foot (206 m) Mutual of Omaha Headquarters Tower was topped out in 2026.

== History ==
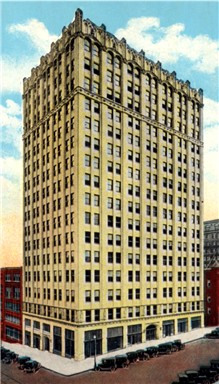
The Medical Arts Building, which was imploded in 1999 to make way for the First National Bank Tower.

In the 1970s, the First National Bank of Omaha outgrew its original headquarters and began drafting plans for a new headquarters. In 1997, the engineering firm Leo A Daly was selected to design the tower. Kiewit Corporation was chosen as the general contractor, and the construction cost was $225 million. The project was announced to the public in 1998. The First National Bank Tower was built on the site of the former Medical Arts Building, which was imploded on April 2, 1999, to make way for the current skyscraper.

In April 1999, Kiewit formally began construction on the building. Between May and June 1999, "Big Stan", the world's largest drilling rig, was brought in to drill the caissons and foundation. On January 23, 2001, the structure's core passed 467 ft (142 m), overtaking the Woodmen Tower's record of 458 ft (140 m) at the time and making the First National Bank Tower the tallest building in Nebraska. The building was officially completed in 2002, with a height of 634 ft (193 m) and 45 stories in total. The building was designed to be three feet (1 meter) higher than both the 801 Grand building in Des Moines and the Gateway Arch in St. Louis, making the final project the tallest building in the Midwest between Denver and Chicago.

In 2022, Mutual of Omaha announced plans for the Mutual of Omaha Headquarters Tower. This building has been described by CEO James Blackledge as "on the scale of the First National Bank tower" and estimated to either be the same height as or overtake First National Bank Tower as the tallest building in the state.

== Design ==
=== Construction ===
The First National Bank Tower follows a postmodern design with a granite facade. Externally, the building has a central tapering structure and an upward-curving base along its eastern side. The bottom six stories are designated as the building's base and host a parking garage nearby. Underneath the building is a series of tunnels that connect the parking garage to the main building.

Lightweight concrete on metal decks was used to form the floor slabs of the building. This was done to minimize dead loads and support planned office and storage spaces. A two-hour fire-rated floor was constructed with 5.25 in (13.3 cm) concrete. The perimeter girder slabs were reinforced with steel, while the rest were reinforced with synthetic fiber. Exterior steel columns were spaced at 10 ft (3 m) around the building's perimeter, and composite wide-flange beams extended 47 ft (14 m) between the building's core and the exterior columns. The original core plan had dimensions of 91 ft 5 in × 39 ft 6 in (27.86 m × 12.04 m). The core was a self-climbing style, housed an elevator shaft, and was constructed with 8000-psi (approximately 5.5 million pascal) concrete to provide lateral resistance to the structure. The core was supported by a 120 ft × 76 ft × 12 ft (36.6 m × 23.2 m × 3.7 m) concrete pile cap and 950 tons (862 metric tons) of steel to combat shear and uplift forces. Construction of the pile cap took 11 hours of continuous concrete pouring and was the "largest single placement of concrete in the state of Nebraska". The foundations of the building were supported by 28 shafts, 90 inches (230 cm) in diameter, that were drilled in the limestone bedrock by the Big Stan drilling rig.

The steel support structure of the parking garage was encased in concrete to emulate a cast-in-place style of construction, while the rest of the parking garage was built with cast-in-place concrete. This was done because the design lacked expansion joints, separation joints, and post-tension concrete; thus, the concrete design was connected to form one single structure. The parking garage was supported by 70 ft-deep (21 m), 30–60-inch-diameter (76–152 cm), drilled shafts with cast-in-place concrete.

Inside the building are two fountains, with a third one located in the tower's front plaza. The lobby was built to feature a 60 ft (18 m) glass winter garden, constructed with bowed tube trusses and a curved cast-in-place concrete wall. The wintergarden also contains a mezzanine that leads to the building's second floor. This is supported by two tapered, cantilevered, cast-in-place concrete supports from a fountain. The lobby also includes the original terracotta facade from the former Medical Arts Building along the lobby's southern wall.

=== Awards ===
Following the completion of the building, its use of cast-in-place concrete and steel during the construction of the building's framework was the recipient of the Nebraska Chapter ACI Award of Excellence for Use of Concrete, the Engineering Excellence Honor Award from the Nebraska Chapter of ACEC, and National Finalist Recognition by the national ACEC organization. The building also won fifth place for the 2002 Emporis Skyscraper Award.

== Gallery ==
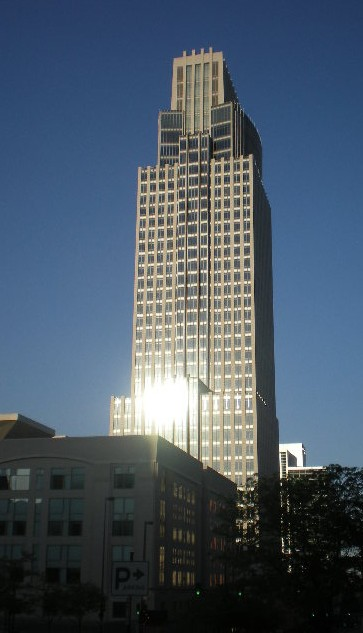
Western facade of the First National Bank Tower

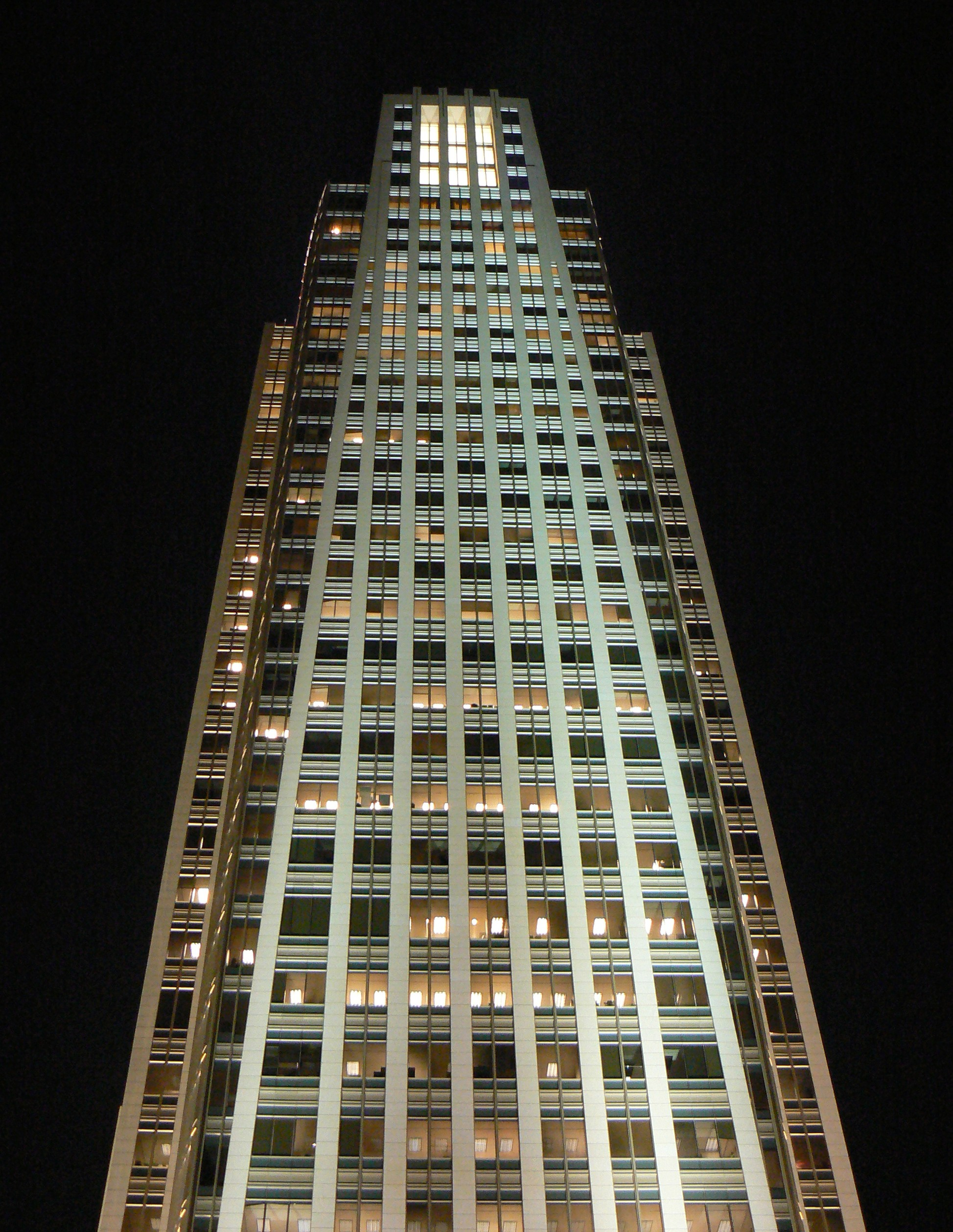
Eastern facade at night

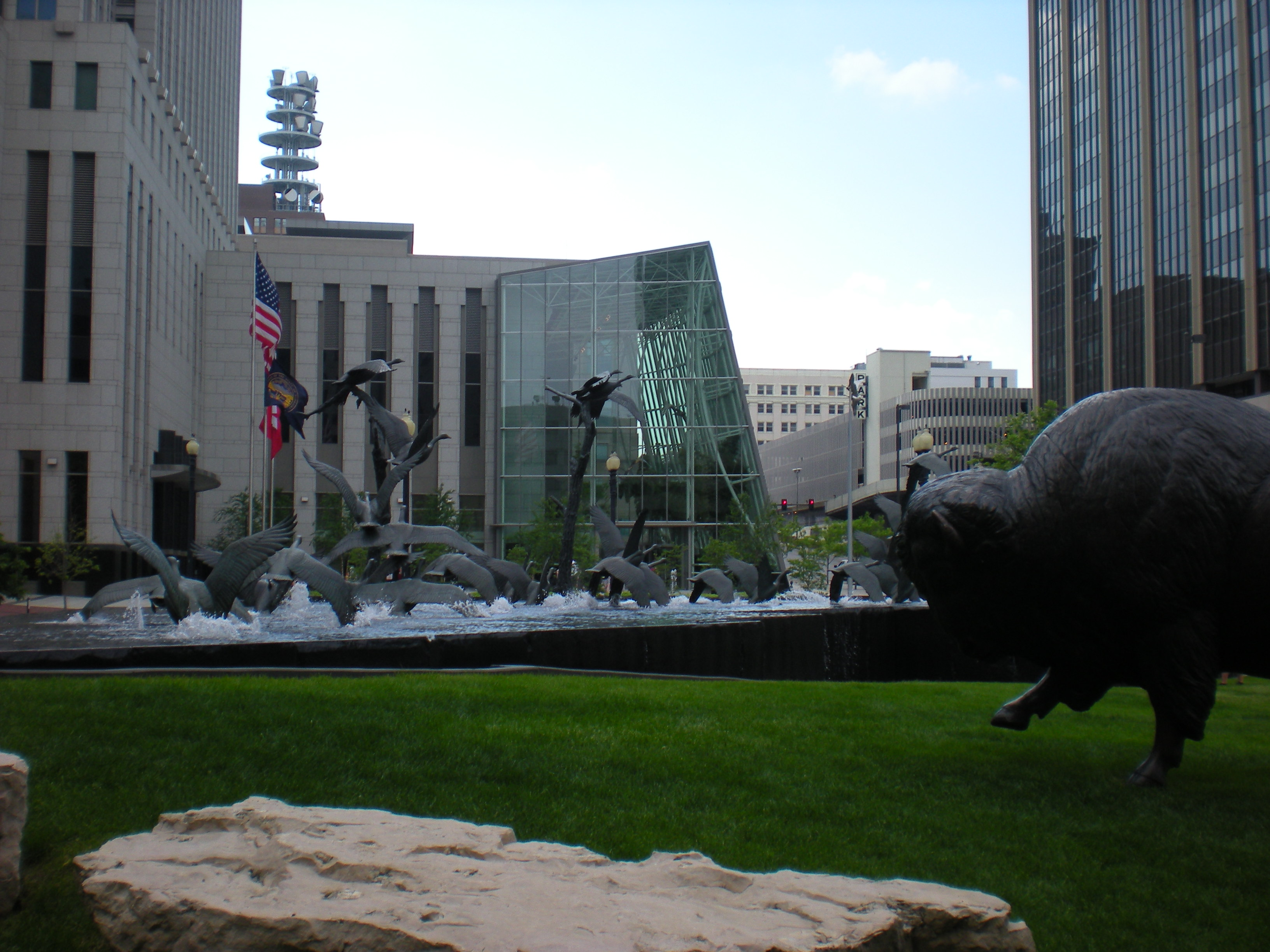
First National Bank Park, across from the tower's front plaza

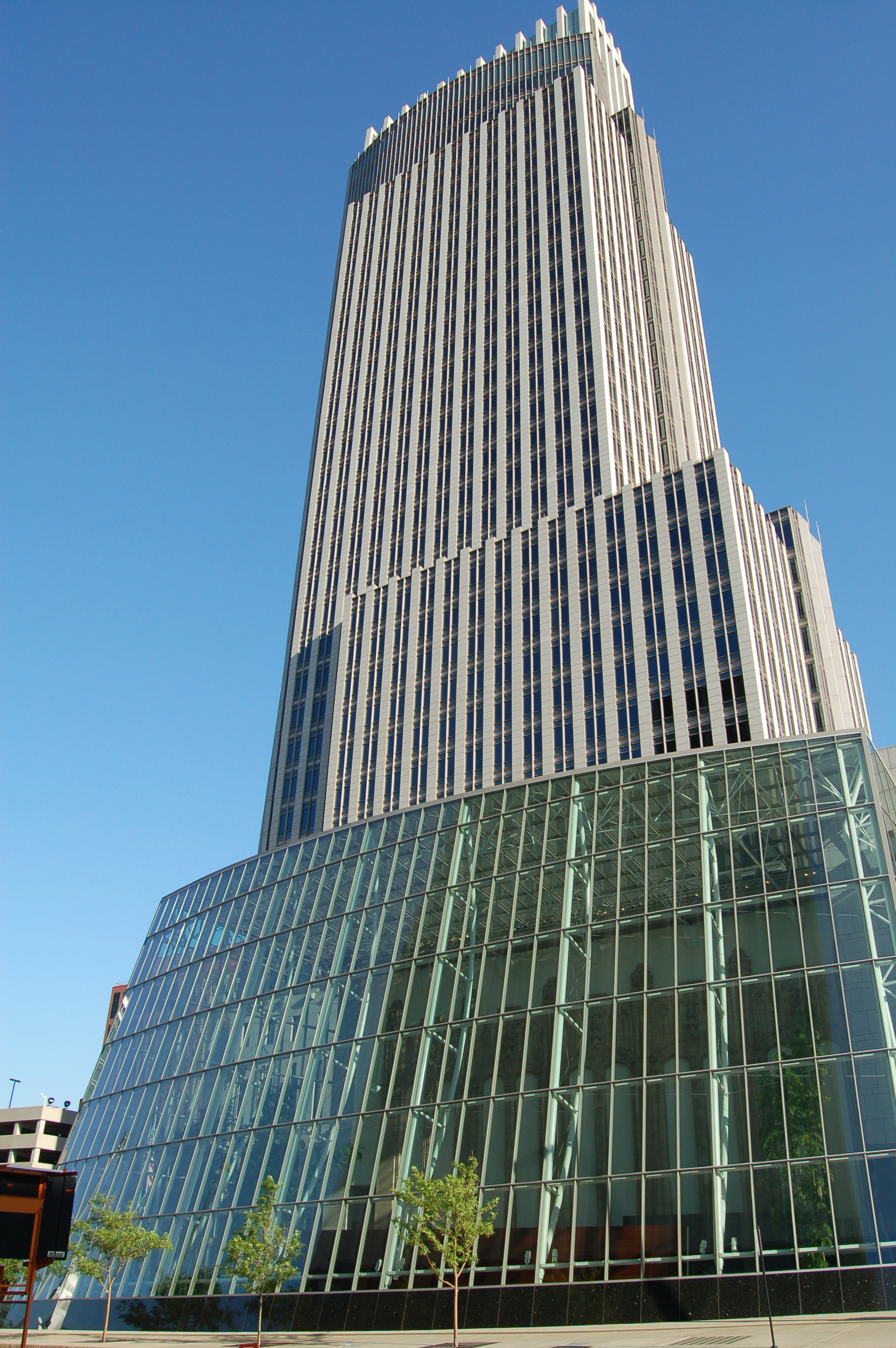
60-foot (18 m) glass wall, with the winter garden inside

== See also ==
- Economy of Omaha, Nebraska
- List of tallest buildings in Omaha, Nebraska
