= Big Stan (drill rig) =

Large vehicle mounted drill rig

Overview
- Type: Vehicle-Mounted Drilling Rig
- Manufacturer: Anderson Drilling
- Production: 1986
- Assembly: Lakeside, California

Powertrain
- Engine: 600 horsepower (450 kW) KTA 1150 Cummins diesel engine
- Transmission: 46 inches (120 cm), double-pinion, six-speed transmission, Allison transmission
- Hybrid drivetrain: Clark final drive, two 14 inches (36 cm) drivebelts

Dimensions
- Height: 93 feet (28 m)
- Curb weight: 125 tons (113.4 metric tons)

Big Stan is a vehicle-mounted drill rig built in 1986 by Anderson Drilling. The rig has been used on a number of construction projects in which conventional, smaller drilling rigs were unable to be used, particularly when projects call for drilling into hard soil. Notably, Big Stan was used in the construction of the First National Bank Tower in Omaha, the Benicia-Martinez bridge near San Francisco, and on expansions to the I-15/215 Beltway in Las Vegas. The drill rig was featured on Discovery Channel's show “Monster Machines” in 2007.

Big Stan features a two-piece design, significantly lowering the time and manpower needed to assemble it compared to contemporary rigs. Big Stan employs a screw conveyor capable of exerting 534,000 pound-feet (724,000 N⋅m) of torque and 75,000 pounds (34,000 kg) of downward force to a maximum depth of 260 feet (79 m). Its drill bit is capable of moving 5 cubic yards (3.8 m^{3}) of soil per rotation and its drill bucket is able to move up to 8 cubic yards (6.1 m^{3}) of soil per rotation. The rig has been estimated as one of, if not the largest, vehicle-mounted drilling rigs in the world.

== History ==
Big Stan was built in 1986 by Anderson Drilling (Now part of Keller Group PLC) in Lakeside, California. The machine cost $1.5 million to construct and was named after the company president at the time, Stan Anderson, who was given a similar nickname due to his height of 6 ft 3 in (1.91 m). The rig was originally built to meet the demand for a more powerful mobile drilling rig, specifically a demand for rigs capable of boring up to 260 feet (79 m) deep. At the time, Big Stan was claimed to be the largest portable drill rig in the United States, with some estimates placing it as the largest vehicle-mounted drill rig in the world.

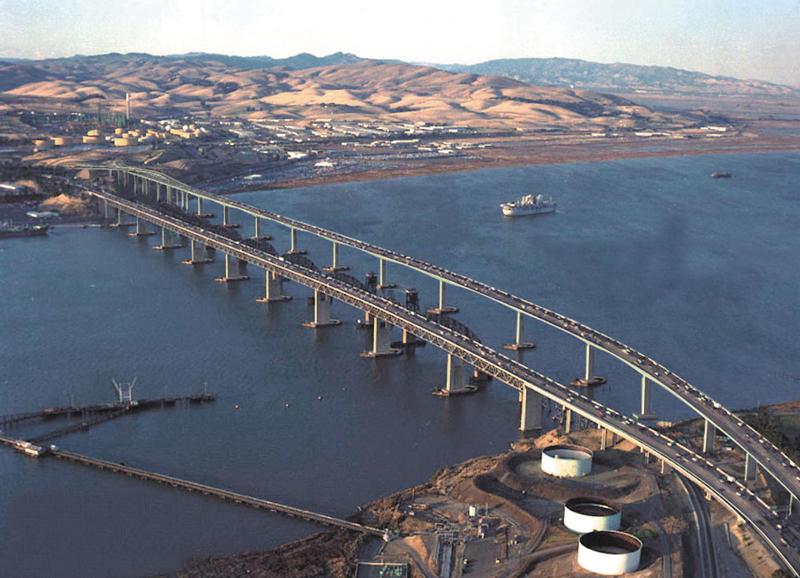
The Benicia–Martinez Bridge, the site where Big Stan was filmed for the show "Monster Machines".

From May to June 1999, Big Stan was used to drill the caissons for the First National Bank Tower in Omaha, Nebraska. In 2004, while working on an expansion to the Benicia-Martinez bridge near San Francisco, Big Stan was filmed by Discovery Channel's Canadian outlet for the show “Monster Machines”. The episode aired in 2007. In June 2007, Big Stan was used in the construction of the Pacific Street Bridge, in Oceanside, California. Big Stan was selected for its ability to achieve depths of 190 feet (58 m); conventional rigs were not capable of tunneling deep enough into the soft riverbed soil to earthquake proof the structure. That same year, Big Stan was used for construction work on the Upper Northwest Interceptor sewage system. This project involved Big Stan drilling 41 vertical shafts, 15 feet (4.6 m) to 21 feet (6.4 m) in diameter, and 34 feet (10 m) to 70 feet (21 m) in depth. These tunnels were later finished by Vadnais Corp. who horizontally connected the segments by micro-tunneling. In January 2009, Big Stan was taken to La Plata County, Colorado to drill at the Ridges Basin Dam. Here, it bored a 115 feet (35 m)-deep, 17 feet (5.2 m) diameter shaft as part of a larger project to build irrigation infrastructure to the surrounding homes. That same year, Big Stan was taken to Snyder, Texas to work on the Snyder Wind Energy Project. Here, it was used to drill 40 feet (12 m) deep caissons into hard clay and sandstone.

In August 2011, the drill rig was moved to Nevada to work on expansions to Interstate 15 in Las Vegas. The drill was contracted due to the lack of machines capable of breaking up the caliche-laden sedimentary rock present in the region. In addition, it was also used in the construction of the Blue Diamond Road flyover. Later that month, Big Stan was used to drill the foundation for the Gold Line basket bridge in Los Angeles, California. In 2015, Big Stan was used in the construction of the Yucca Loma Bridge in Apple Valley, California.

== Design ==
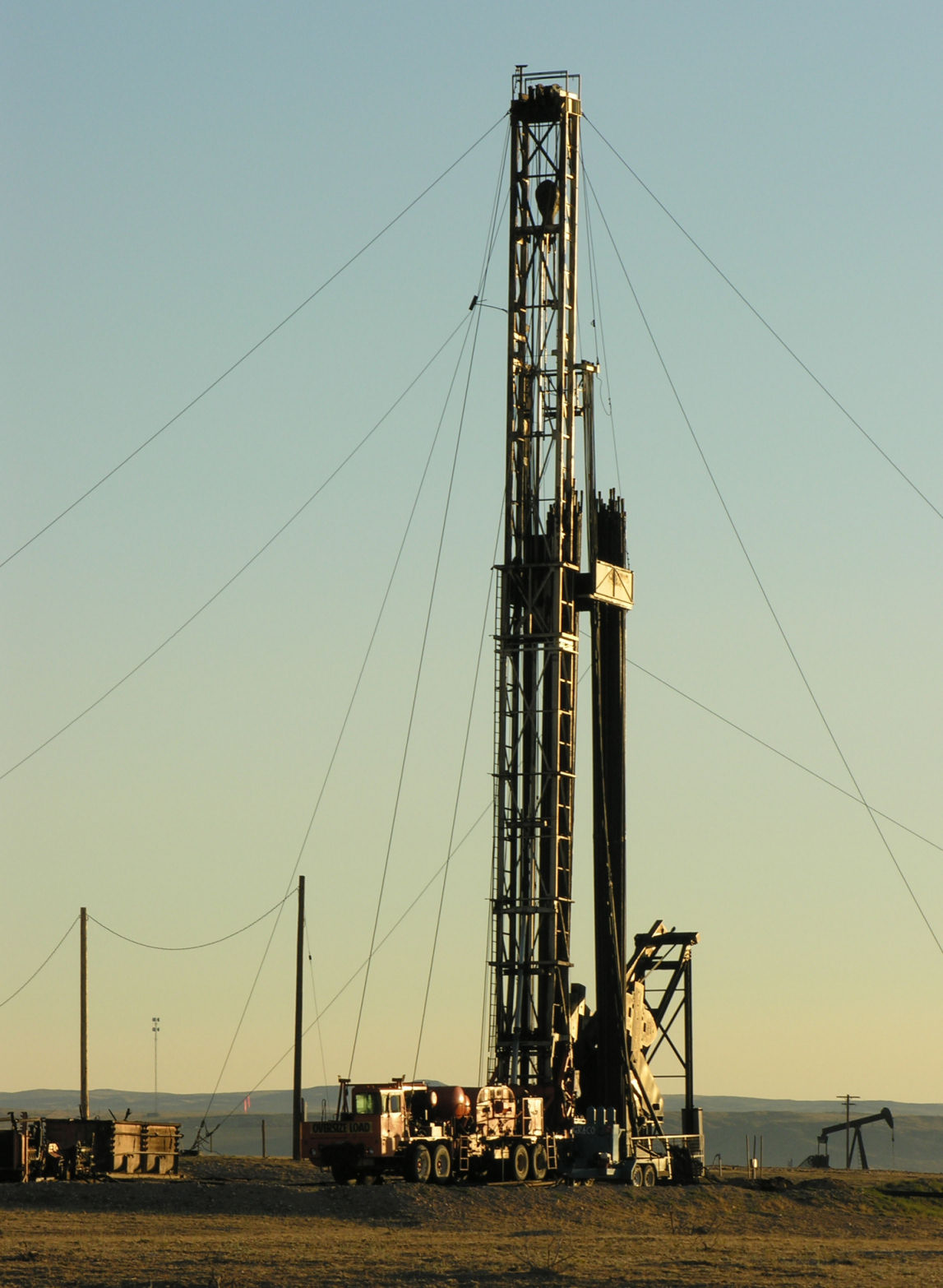
Mobile Drill Rig in Wyoming, featuring a similar design to Big Stan

Big Stan was designed as a vehicle mounted drill rig that is normally mounted on a 40 feet (12 m) long, 5-axle truck, but is also compatible with a specially designed continuous track-style carrier. When made fully operational, the top of the drill (the boom arm) can extend to 93 feet (28 m) in height when leveled with the ground. The truck Big Stan is normally mounted to is equipped with 5 hydraulic jacks designed to lift, tilt, and lower the drill. These jacks provide the drill with 35,000 pounds (16,000 kg) of lifting force and 360 degrees of rotation. These hydraulic jacks can also be used for rig assembly and breakdown. Big Stan can uniquely be split into two pieces which can be transported independently. When split apart, the engine and upper tower are carried by a 7-axle tractor-trailer, while the lower tower and rest of the drill are carried by a 5-axle tractor-trailer. This is in contrast to other contemporary drill rigs, which required being dismantled into 8 to 10 pieces for transport. This design, along with the vehicle mount's built-in hydraulic jacks, allow a team of two people to assemble the rig in 30 minutes, compared to other contemporary rigs that required upwards of a week to properly set up.

Big Stan weighs 125 tons (113.4 metric tons), and is capable of exerting 534,000 pound-feet (724,000 N⋅m) of torque and 75,000 pounds (34,000 kg) of downward force (crowd pressure). Big Stan features a screw conveyor, or auger, as its primary means of excavating soil. The drill is capable of boring down 200 feet (61 m) at up to 39 rpm and its auger weighs 15,000 pounds (6,800 kg). The drill can accommodate a drill bit that is up to 30 feet (9.1 m) in diameter and move dirt at a rate of up to 5 cubic yards (3.8 m^{3}) per rotation, depending on diameter, or drill buckets with capacities up to 8 cubic yards (6.1 m^{3}). The rotary table has a 46 inches (120 cm) diameter, double-pinion ring gear driven by a six-speed transmission built by Allison transmission, through a drivetrain with two 14 inches (36 cm) drivebelts made by Clark. Big Stan is powered by a 600 horsepower (450 kW), six-cylinder diesel engine made by Cummins.

Big Stan specifications
Category	Units
Lifting Force	35,000 pounds (16,000 kg)
Torque	534,000 pound-feet (724,000 N⋅m)
Downward Force	75,000 pounds (34,000 kg)
Auger Weight	15,000 pounds (6,800 kg)
Maximum Bore Rate	39 rpm down to 200 feet (61 m)
Maximum Drill Bit	30 feet (9.1 m) in diameter
Maximum Drill Bit Capacity	5 cubic yards (3.8 m^{3})
Maximum Drill Bucket Capacity	8 cubic yards (6.1 m^{3})

== See also ==
- Tunnel boring machine
- Trenchless technology
- Boring (manufacturing)
