= WoodmenLife Tower =

Office skyscraper in Omaha, Nebraska

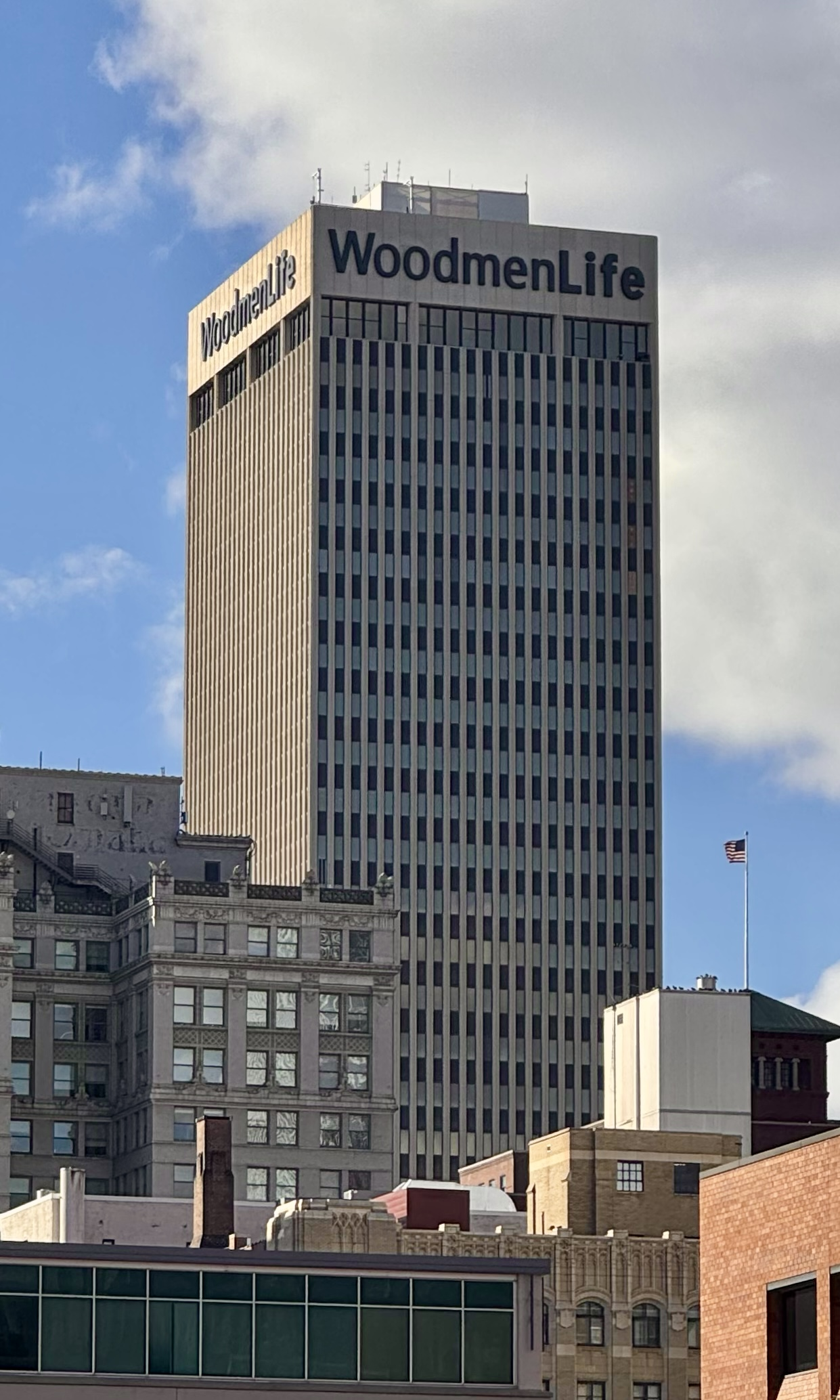
- WoodmenLife Tower in 2025
- Interactive map of the WoodmenLife Tower area

Record height
- Tallest in Nebraska from 1969 to 2002^{[I]}
- Preceded by: Nebraska State Capitol Building
- Surpassed by: First National Bank Tower

General information
- Status: Completed
- Architectural style: International Style
- Location: 1700 Farnam Street; Omaha, Nebraska, U.S.
- Coordinates: 41.2580°N 95.9393°W
- Construction started: 1966
- Completed: 1969
- Owner: Woodmen of the World Life Insurance Society

Height
- Roof: 478 ft (146 m)

Technical details
- Floor count: 30

Design and construction
- Architect: Leo A Daly
- Main contractor: Kiewit Corporation

Other information
- Public transit: Metro Transit

The WoodmenLife Tower (formerly the Woodmen Tower or Woodmen of the World Tower) is an office skyscraper in Downtown Omaha, Nebraska, United States, and headquarters of the insurance company WoodmenLife. Construction of the building began in 1966 and was completed in the spring of 1969. At its completion, the 478-foot (146 m), 30-story tower was the tallest building in the state of Nebraska, overtaking the Nebraska State Capitol. It would hold this record for over thirty years until 2002, when it was overtaken by First National Bank Tower.

WoodmenLife Tower was praised upon completion for its role in revitalizing downtown Omaha. The exterior features an LED display that lights up the building for holidays and special events, including the “WoodmenLife” sign at the tower’s top, installed in 2020 after the tower’s renaming as part of a company rebranding effort. Since 1988, the tower has been part of the Nebraska Peregrine Falcon Project, where peregrine falcons breed and nest on the building's 28th floor.

== Description ==
The WoodmenLife Tower is a 478-foot (146 m), 30-story international-style skyscraper located at 1700 Farnam Street in Downtown Omaha. Designed by the architectural firm Leo A Daly and constructed by Peter Kiewit Sons' Inc., the tower serves as the headquarters for Woodmen of the World Life Insurance Society, who do business simply as WoodmenLife. Throughout its lifetime, the building has had a sprinkler system, floodlights, a car wash, and additional parking infrastructure installed.

The building features a dual-roof design; the main roof stands at 456 feet (139 m) above ground, while a secondary roof marks the building's peak of 478 feet (146 m). During construction, the tower used 16,000 cubic yards (12,000 m^{3}) of concrete and 16 million pounds (7.3 million kilograms) of steel. The total floor area is 533,281 square feet (49,543 m^{2}); WoodmenLife occupies the majority of the office space, while other tenants include U.S. Bank and various law firms, alongside other commercial and non-profit entities.

Initial construction costs upon completion of the building were approximately $20 million, the building was valued at $40 million by Douglas County in 2014. In 2020, as part of a corporate rebranding, the "Woodmen" signage at the top of the tower was replaced with new "WoodmenLife" lettering to reflect the company's rebranding. These LED-backlit letters are visible from up to 78 miles (126 km) away by aircraft.

== History ==
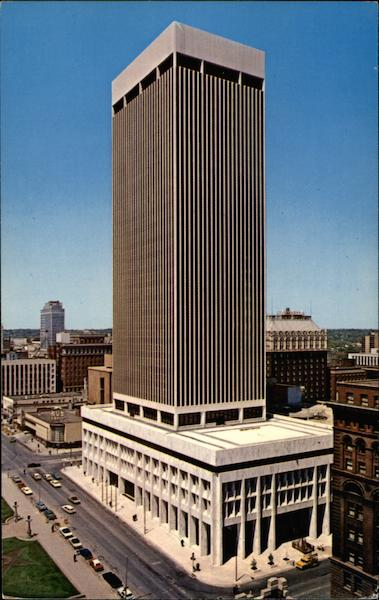
Woodmen Tower, c. 1970.

In the 1960s, Woodmen of the World Life Insurance Society announced plans to construct a new headquarters. After discussions with a consulting firm, it was decided to keep their headquarters in downtown Omaha at the same address. This involved demolishing and replacing the Edward Rosewater's Bee Building, which had been owned by Woodmen of the World since 1932 and served as their previous headquarters. The plot of land the WoodmenLife Tower occupies was previously taken up by several other buildings in Omaha's downtown, including the Old City Hall building. Following the land acquisition, Omaha National Bank (now a branch of U.S. Bank) signed as the first major tenant.

Construction on the Woodmen Tower began on May 23, 1966. The original design of the build was only 20 to 22 stories with a total cost of $20 million. These plans were modified during construction. Initially, the height was increased to 28 stories, then later increased again to 29 stories. Following flooding issues in the bottom two levels of the underground parking garage, the 29th floor was split into two floors, making the total count 30.

In November 1967, the building was topped during a ceremony attended by then Omaha mayor Alexander V. Sorensen. On April 4, 1969, the Woodmen Tower was officially completed and opened; dedication of the building occurred on June 6, 1966. This made it the tallest building in the state of Nebraska. The tower surpassed the Nebraska State Capitol as the tallest building in Nebraska, which previously held the title since 1930. The Woodmen Tower remained the tallest skyscraper in both Omaha and Nebraska for over 30 years, until construction of the First National Bank Tower in 2002.

Following the official opening, the restaurant Top of the World was opened on the 28th floor. Although this restaurant was successful, it eventually closed November 1, 1984 to make way for office space. In 1990, in celebration of Woodmen of the World Life Insurance Society's 100th anniversary, time capsules earmarked for 2040 were placed in the lobby floor. In 2002, the Woodmen Tower was featured prominently in Alexander Payne's film About Schmidt, where the titular character Warren Schmidt (played by Jack Nicholson) was employed at the building. Later that year, completion of the First National Bank Tower took away Woodmen Tower's status as the tallest building in the state, leaving it in second place to this day.

In 2014, in celebration of the tower's 45th anniversary, the building was renovated with LED lighting, putting on a light show as part of the celebration. The LED installation involved over 14,000 bulbs across all 4 sides of the building. Since then, the building has been lit up for holidays, the College World Series, Alzheimer's awareness, and other special events. This same year, the Woodmen of the World became involved in a minor controversy when it requested that the Woodmen Tower be exempt from some property taxes. Woodmen of the World threatened to move headquarters if this exemption was not provided, citing this exemption as guaranteed under the Nebraska State Constitution to fraternal organizations. This sparked a larger debate by the Douglas County Board over whether Woodmen of the World should be classified as a charity or a profitable business. In 2015, this issue was resolved when Legislative Bill 414 was passed, granting the tax exemption (an estimated 73% decrease in total taxes) to the Woodmen Tower.

In 2020, Woodmen of the World Life Insurance Society rebranded to WoodmenLife Insurance Company. Initially, it was believed that the Woodmen lettering on top of the building was to remain, but it was later announced by the company that the letters were to be replaced with WoodmenLife. The total project cost millions of dollars and saw another new LED system installed, this time centered around the WoodmenLife letters so that they light up during the night.

== Peregrine falcon project ==
In response to the falling populations of the peregrine falcon in the 1950s, the Nebraska Peregrine Falcon Project (NPFP) began breeding falcons in captivity and releasing them. In 1988, the NPFP, led by the Nebraska Game and Parks Commission and Fontenelle Forest's Raptor Recovery program, first released seven falcons from the top of Woodmen Tower. This was followed by another release in 1989, during which two falcons later returned to the Woodmen Tower to nest on the 28th floor. In 1992, one of these released falcons returned to Woodmen Tower where it mated and laid three eggs that later hatched. This marked the first peregrine falcons hatched in Nebraska in almost a century. As of 2014, approximately 70 falcons have been hatched from the WoodmenLife Tower.

Falcons continue to nest on the building, and WoodmenLife Tower maintains a live webcam of the nests on their official website.

== Reception ==
During construction, Omaha mayor Alexander V. Sorensen described the Woodmen Tower as the “most magnificent building between Chicago and Denver”. During the topping ceremony, Sorensen stated "If ever there was a symbol of faith in Omaha's future, this is it.” According to the Douglas County Historical Society and the Omaha World-Herald, the Woodmen Tower played a significant role in the revitalization of Omaha's downtown district. The Woodmen and WoodmenLife lettering on the building's roof is considered 'iconic' to Omaha's skyline.

Insider has listed the WoodmenLife Tower as the ugliest building in the state of Nebraska.

== Gallery ==
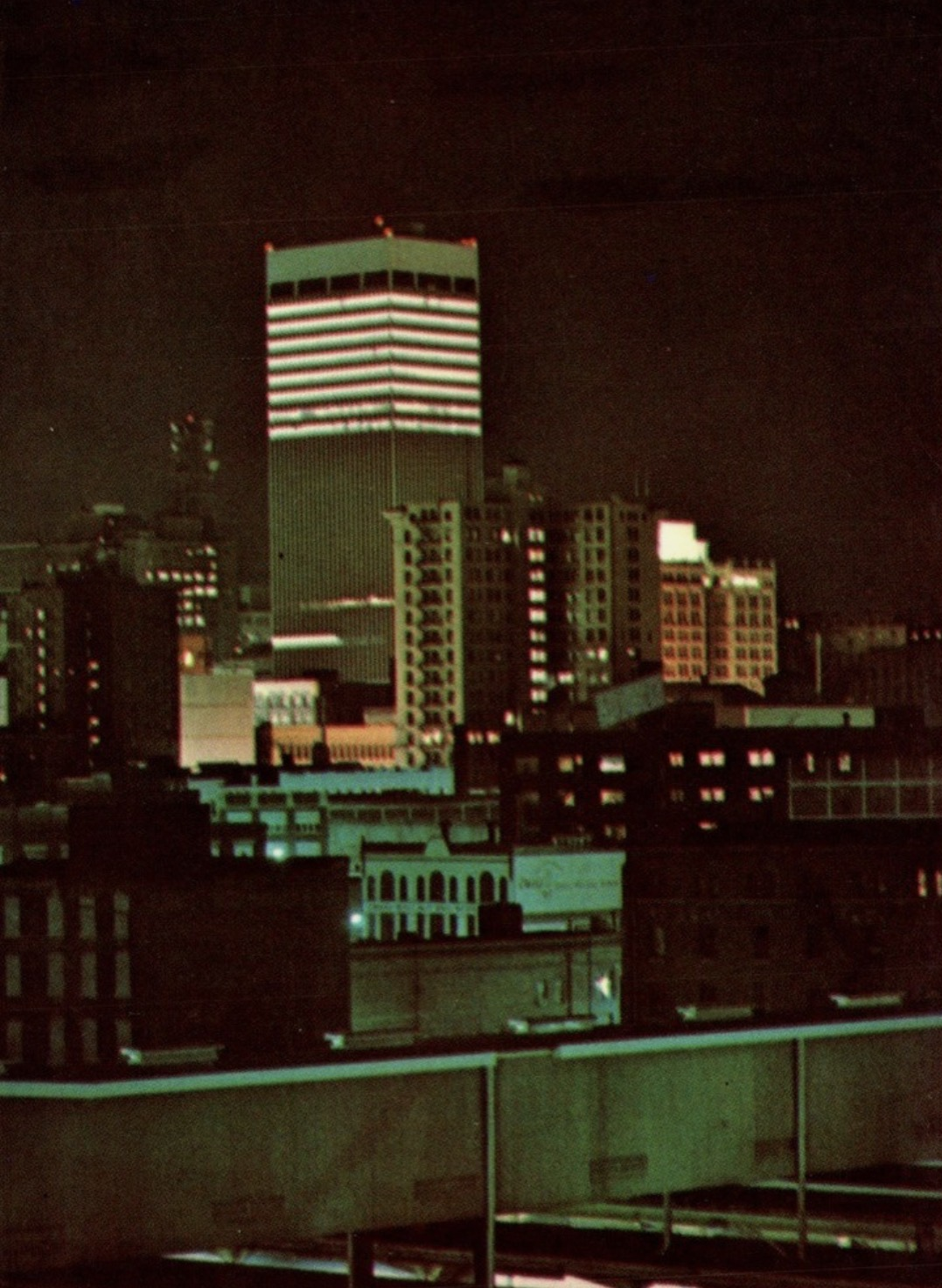
The tower and surrounding skyline, c. 1971.

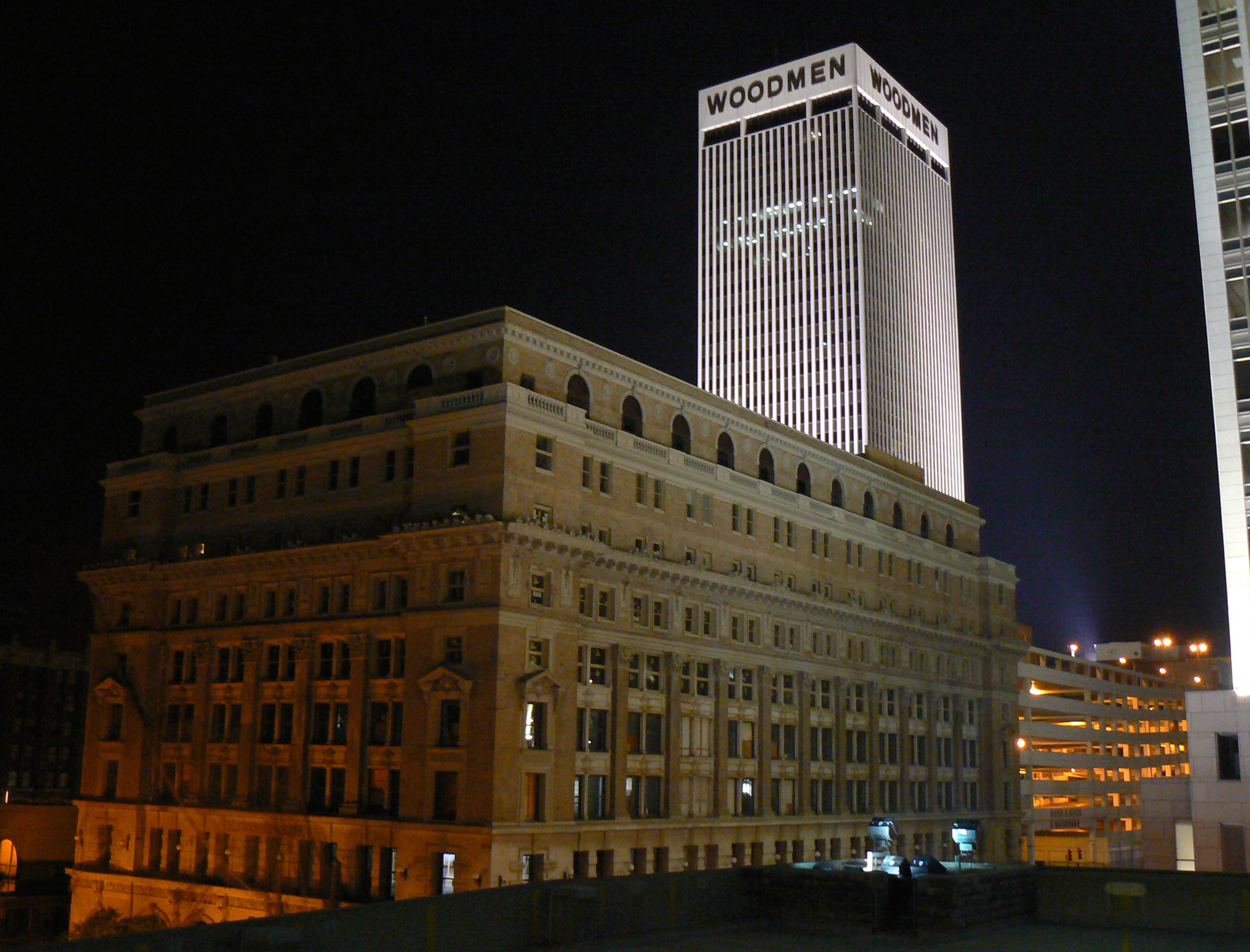
Woodmen Tower rises just west of the J. L. Brandeis and Sons Store Building.

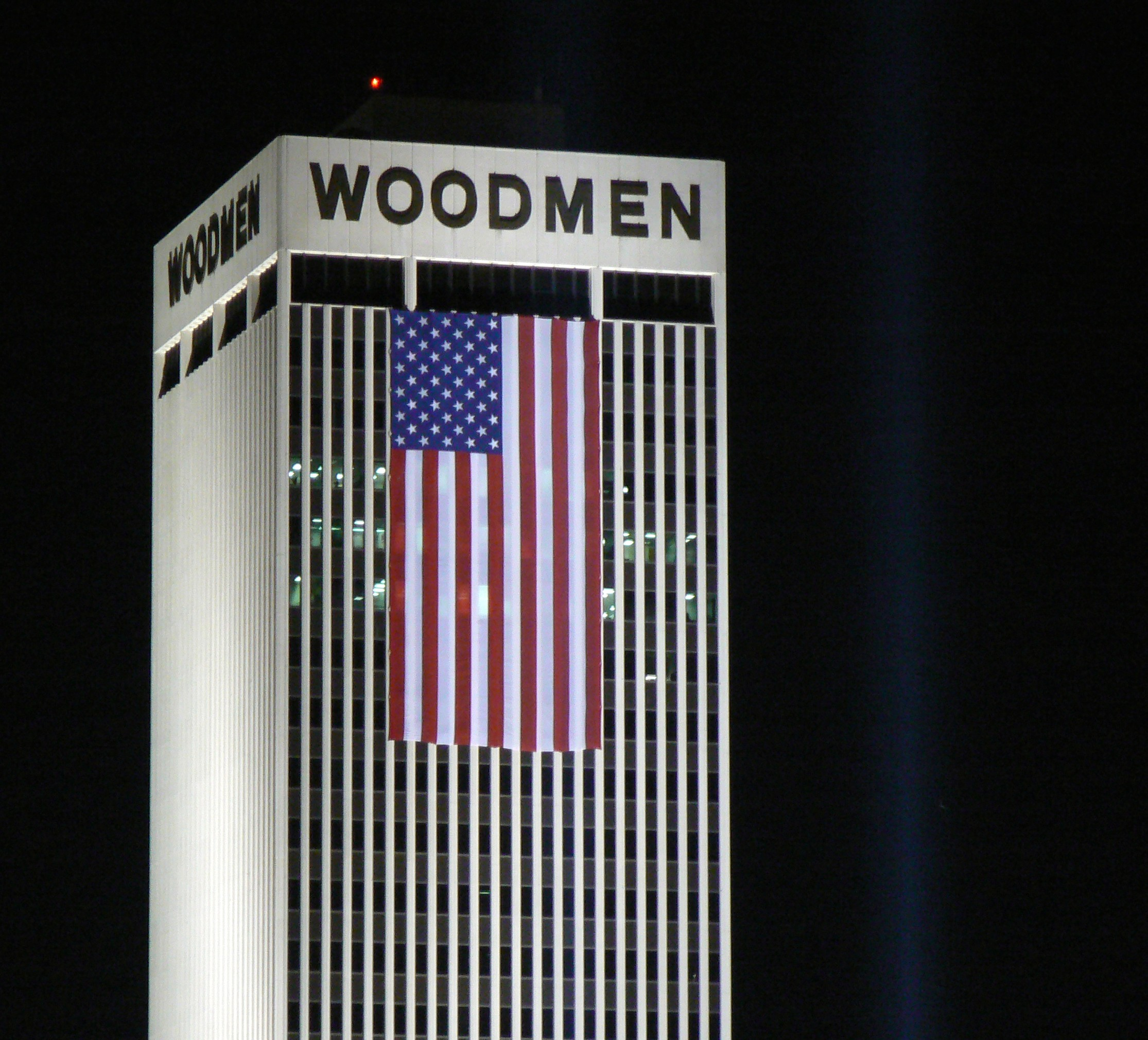
In September 2006, Woodmen Tower marked the fifth anniversary of the September 11 attacks by displaying large American flags draped from its upper floors.

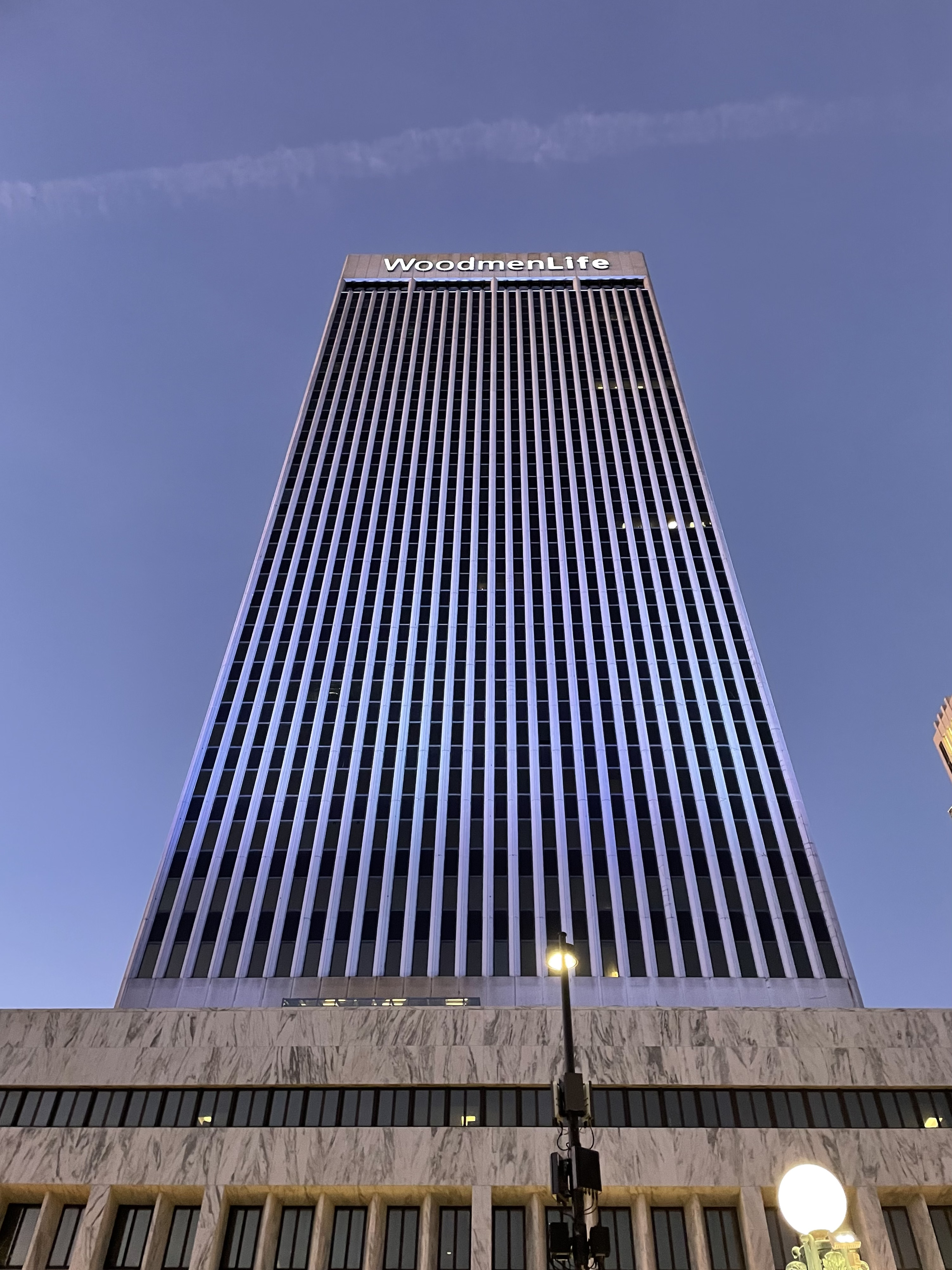
The tower in October 2022

== See also ==
- Economy of Omaha, Nebraska
- List of tallest buildings in Omaha, Nebraska
