= List of tallest buildings in Little Rock =

Skyline of Little Rock
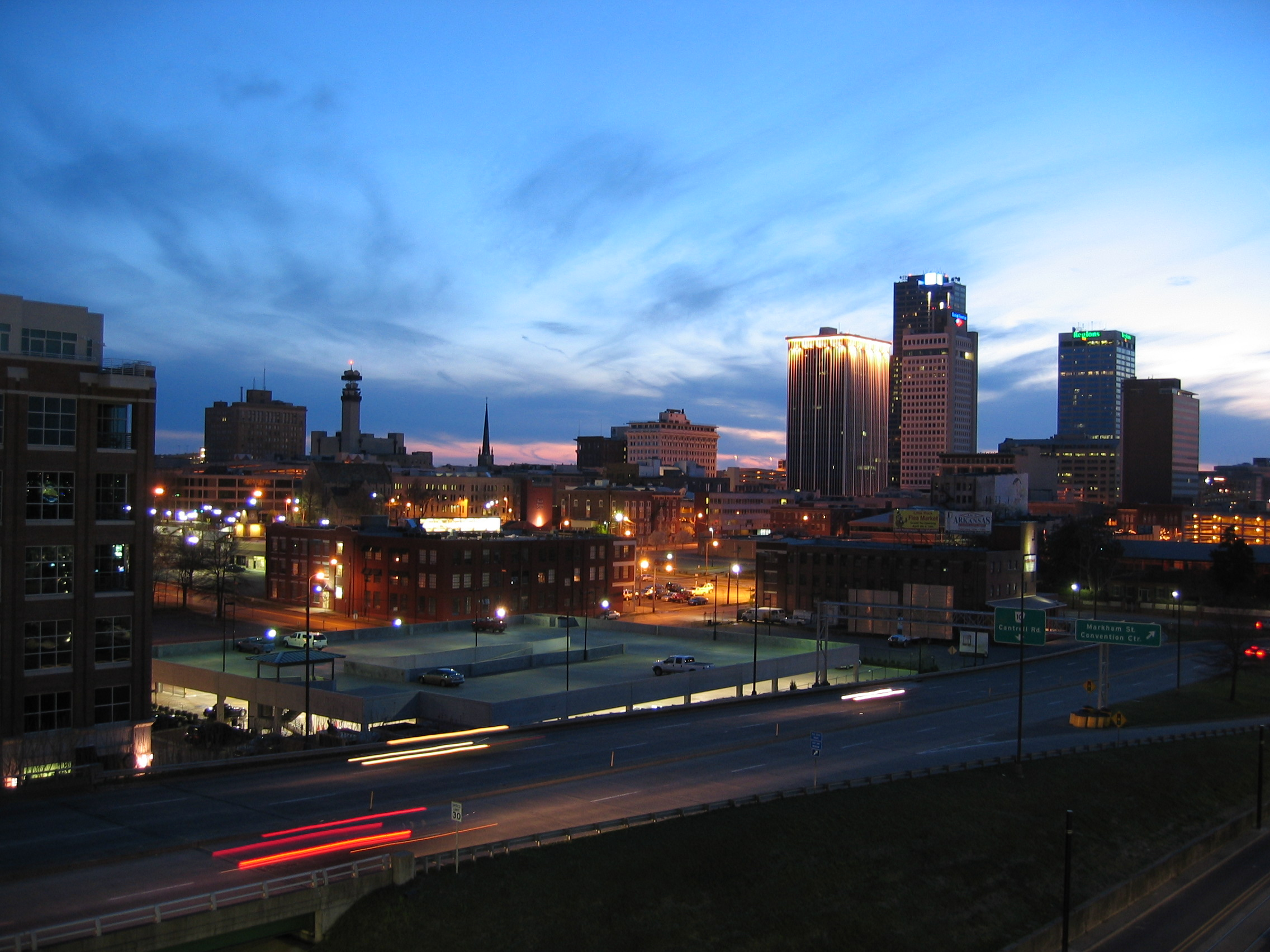
- The skyline of Little Rock at night in 2005
- Tallest building: Simmons Tower (1986)
- Tallest building height: 546 ft (166 m)
- First 150 m+ building: Simmons Tower (1986)

Number of tall buildings
- 20 stories or more: 6
- Taller than 75 m (246 ft): 6
- Taller than 100 m (328 ft): 5
- Taller than 150 m (492 ft): 1

Number of tall buildings — feet
- Taller than 200 ft (61.0 m): 11
- Taller than 300 ft (91.4 m): 6
- Taller than 400 ft (122 m): 2

Little Rock is the state capital and largest city in the U.S. state of Arkansas. As of 2026, the city has a population of 205,857 people. The city currently has 11 buildings that stand over 200 ft (61 m) tall. The tallest building in Little Rock is the 546 ft (166 m) tall Simmons Tower which was built in 1986. As of now, the tower is the only building in Arkansas that is classified as a "true" skyscraper (a building that stands over 492 ft (150 m) tall). The second tallest building in Little Rock is the 454 ft (138 m) tall Regions Center which was built in 1975. The most recently completed high-rise is the 240 ft (73 m) tall River Market Tower which was built in 2009.

== Cityscape ==
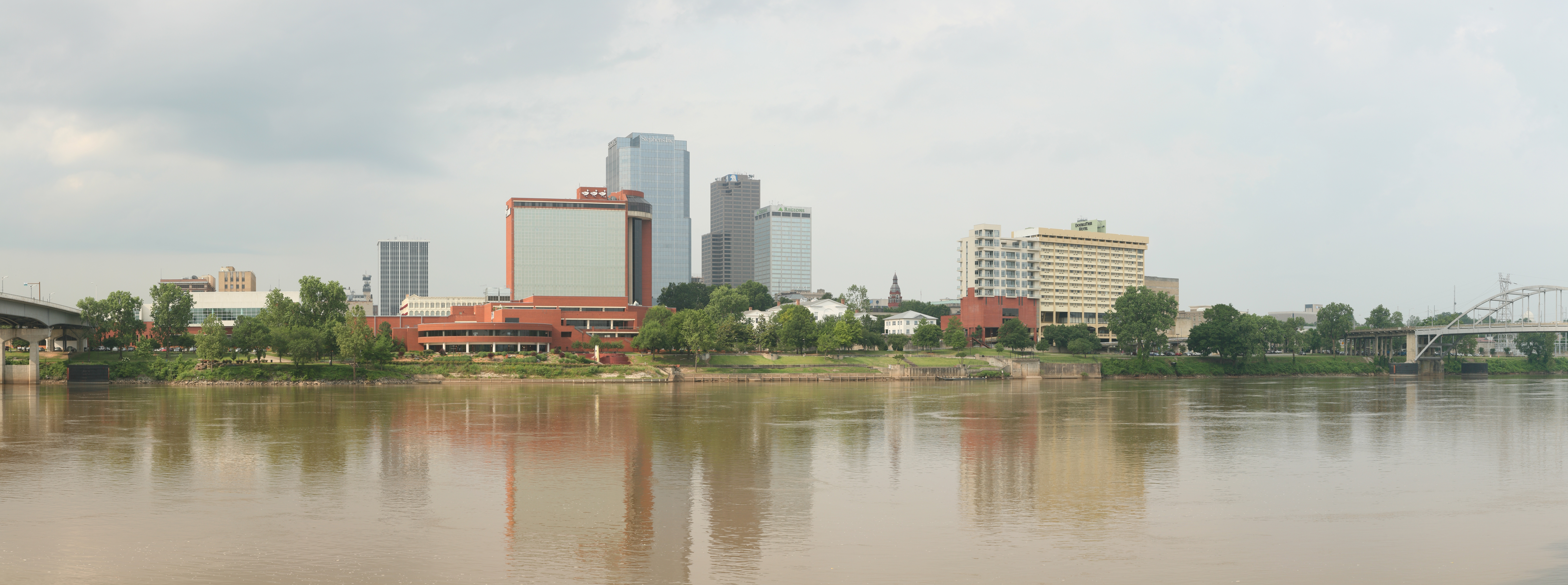
The Skyline of Little Rock in 2009.

== Map of tallest buildings ==
The map below shows the locations of the buildings in Little Rock that stand over 200 ft (61 m) in height. Each marker is given a number based on the buildings ranking in the list. The color of each marker represents the decade that the building was completed in.

Buildings in Little Rock that stand over 200 ft (61 m).
- 1950s and before
- 1960s
- 1970s
- 1980s
- 1990s
- 2000s
- 2010s
- 2020s
1 Simmons Tower
2 Regions Center
3 Bank of America Plaza
4 Stephens Building
5 One Union National Plaza
6 Tower Building
7 River Market Tower
8 Arkansas State Capitol
9 Cathedral of St. Andrew
10 300 Third Tower
11 The Peabody Little Rock

== History ==
Number of buildings by height in Little Rock by the end of each year. Click on the legend to toggle a specific height on or off. View chart definition.

== Tallest buildings ==
This list ranks buildings in Little Rock that stand at least 200 ft (61 m) tall. Spires and other architectural details are included in the height of a building; however, antennas are excluded.

Tallest building in Little Rock upon completion

Rank	Name	Image	Location	Height	Floors	Year	Purpose	Notes
1	Simmons Tower	MetroBankLR	34°44′38″N 92°16′32″W	546 ft (166 m)	40	1986	Office	Formerly known as the Metropolitan Tower and the Capitol Tower. Tallest building in Little Rock and Arkansas.
2	Regions Center	Regions Center	34°44′42″N 92°16′31″W	454 ft (138 m)	30	1975	Office	Tallest building in Little Rock from 1975 to 1986.
3	Bank of America Plaza	Bank_of_America,_Little_Rock,_cropped	34°44′41″N 92°16′23″W	375 ft (114 m)	24	1969	Office	Tallest building in Little Rock from 1969 to 1975.
4	Stephens Building	Stephens_Building_(Little_Rock,_Arkansas)	34°44′52″N 92°16′21″W	365 ft (111 m)	35	1985	Office	Headquarters of Stephens.
5	One Union National Plaza	Boyle Building, Regions Center, Bank of America Plaza & One Union National Plaza - Little Rock, AR	34°44′40″N 92°16′19″W	331 ft (101 m)	22	1968	Office	Tallest building in Little Rock from 1968 to 1969.
6	Tower Building	Tower Building (Little Rock, Arkansas)	34°44′44″N 92°16′22″W	300 ft (91 m)	18	1960	Office	Tallest building in Little Rock from 1960 to 1968. Listed on the National Register of Historic Places.
7	River Market Tower	Clinton Presidential Park Bridge Little Rock AR 2013-06-07 011 (cropped)	34°44′43″N 92°16′01″W	240 ft (73 m)	20	2009	Residential	Tallest building in Little Rock built in the 2000s.
8	Arkansas State Capitol	Arkansas_State_Capitol_-_54118103246	34°44′47″N 92°17′20″W	230 ft (70 m)	4	1916	Government	Tallest building in Little Rock from 1916 to 1960. Home of the Arkansas General Assembly.
9	Cathedral of St. Andrew	Cathedral_of_Saint_Andrew,_Little_Rock,_Arkansas	34°44′33″N 92°16′20″W	220 ft (67 m)		1881	Religion	Tallest building in Little Rock from 1881 to 1916. Tallest Church in Little Rock. Listed on the National Register of Historic Places.
10	300 Third Tower	2018_05_11_Downtown_Little_Rock_05_2048	34°44′45″N 92°16′03″W	218 ft (66 m)	18	2007	Residential	Designed by AMR Architects.
11	Little Rock Marriott	Marriott Little Rock pano (cropped)	34°44′55″N 92°16′18″W	217 ft (66 m)	18	1982	Hotel	Formerly The Peabody Little Rock. The building is currently the only full service Marriott in Arkansas.

== Tallest under construction ==
There are no buildings in Little Rock under construction which stand over 200 ft (61 m)

Rank	Name	Height	Floor Count	Year (est.)	Notes

== Timeline of tallest buildings ==
Name	Image	Years as tallest	Height	Floors	Notes
Cathedral of St. Andrew	Saint_Andrews_Catholic_Cathedral,_Little_Rock,_AR	1881-1916	220 ft (67 m)		
Arkansas State Capitol	Arkansas_State_Capitol,_Woodlane_Street_and_Capitol_Avenue,_Little_Rock,_AR_-_54013704517	1916-1960	230 ft (70 m)	4	
Tower Building	Tower_Building_(Little_Rock,_Arkansas)	1960-1968	300 ft (91 m)	18	
One Union National Plaza	Moore Building, Little Rock, AR	1968-1969	331 ft (101 m)	22	
Bank of America Plaza	Bank of America, Little Rock, cropped	1969-1975	375 ft (114 m)	24	
Regions Center	Regions Center	1975-1986	454 ft (138 m)	30	
Simmons Tower	Metropolitan_National_Bank_Tower	1986-Present	546 ft (166 m)	40	

== See also ==
- List of tallest buildings in Memphis
- List of tallest buildings in New Orleans
- List of tallest buildings in Mobile
- List of tallest buildings in Tampa
