= Stuart Building (Lincoln, Nebraska) =

- U.S. National Register of Historic Places
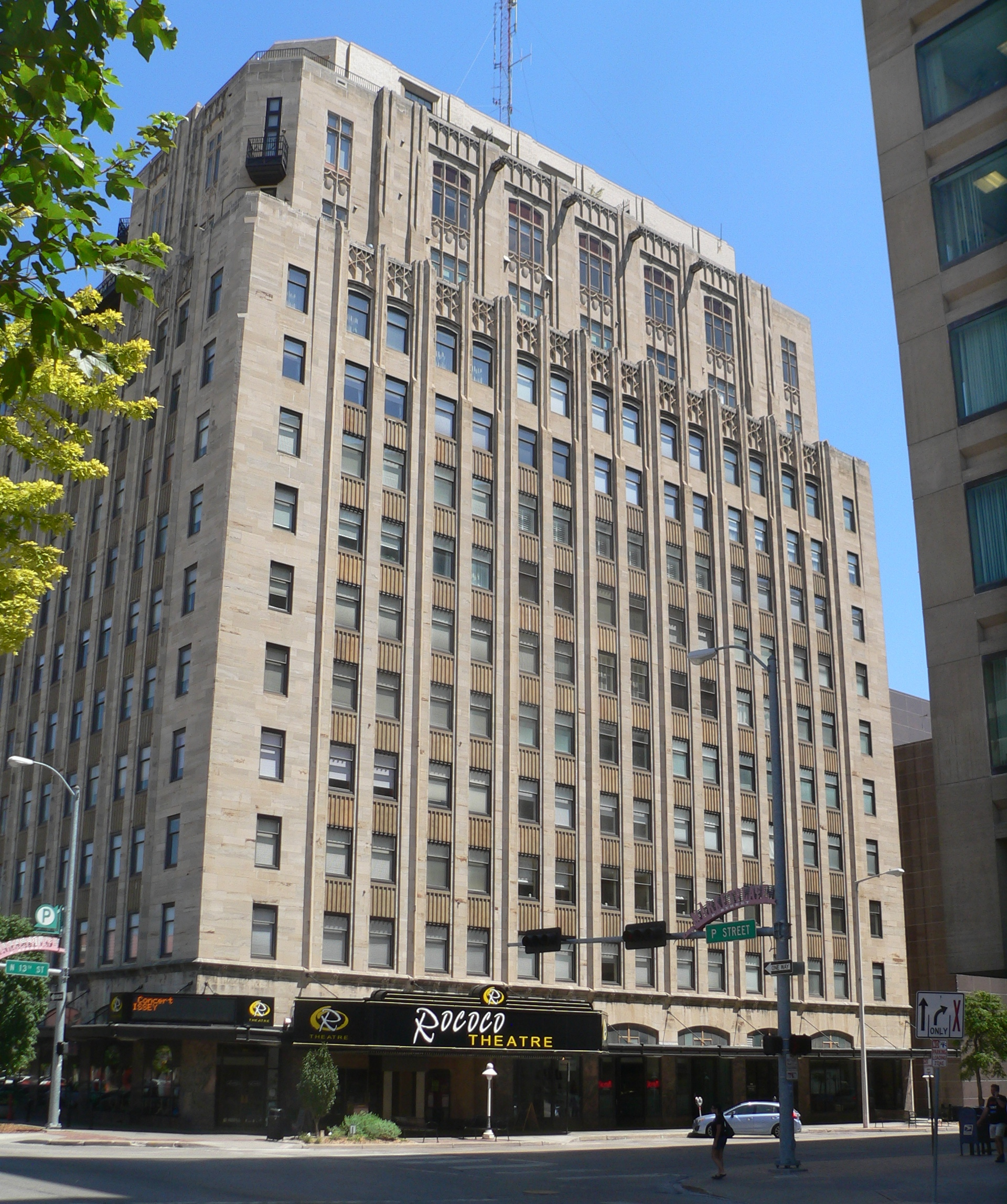
- The building in 2012

- Location within Nebraska Location within the United States
- Location: 13th and P Streets, Lincoln, Nebraska
- Coordinates: 40°48′52″N 96°42′07″W
- Area: less than one acre
- Built: 1927
- Built by: Olson Construction Company
- Architect: Davis & Wilson
- Architectural style: Art Deco, Gothic Revival
- NRHP reference No.: 03001341
- Added to NRHP: December 23, 2003

The Stuart Building is a historic 10-story building in Lincoln, Nebraska. It was built by the Olson Construction Company in 1927 for the Stuart Investment Company, founded in 1880. It was designed in the Art Deco and Gothic Revival styles by architects Davis & Wilson. It has been listed on the National Register of Historic Places since December 23, 2003.
