= Hotel Capital =

Historic building in Lincoln, Nebraska, US

- U.S. National Register of Historic Places
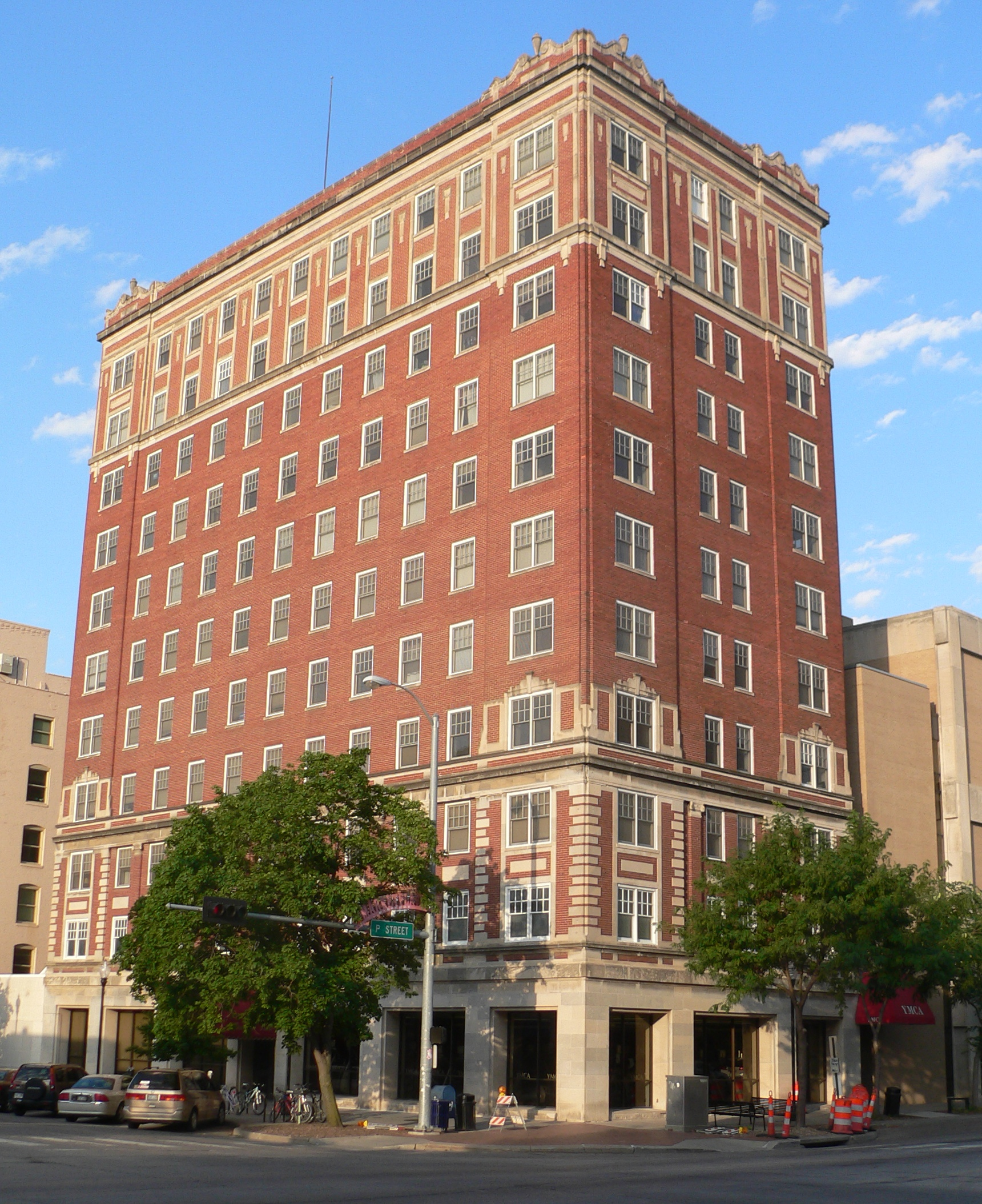
- The hotel in 2012

- Location within Nebraska Location within the United States
- Location: 139 North 11th Street, Lincoln, Nebraska
- Coordinates: 40°48′52″N 96°42′20″W
- Area: less than one acre
- Built: 1926
- Built by: H. L. Stevens & Co.
- Architectural style: Georgian Revival
- NRHP reference No.: 83003994
- Added to NRHP: December 5, 1983

Hotel Capital is a historic hotel building in Lincoln, Nebraska. It was built by H. L. Stevens & Co. in 1925–1926, and designed in the Georgian Revival style, with "quoins, diminutive blind balustrade sections, Ionic pi 1 asters 9 classical window surrounds, panels, stringcourses, and stone urns." It has been listed on the National Register of Historic Places since December 5, 1983.
