= Terminal Building (Lincoln, Nebraska) =

Historic office building in Lincoln, Nebraska, U.S.

- U.S. National Register of Historic Places
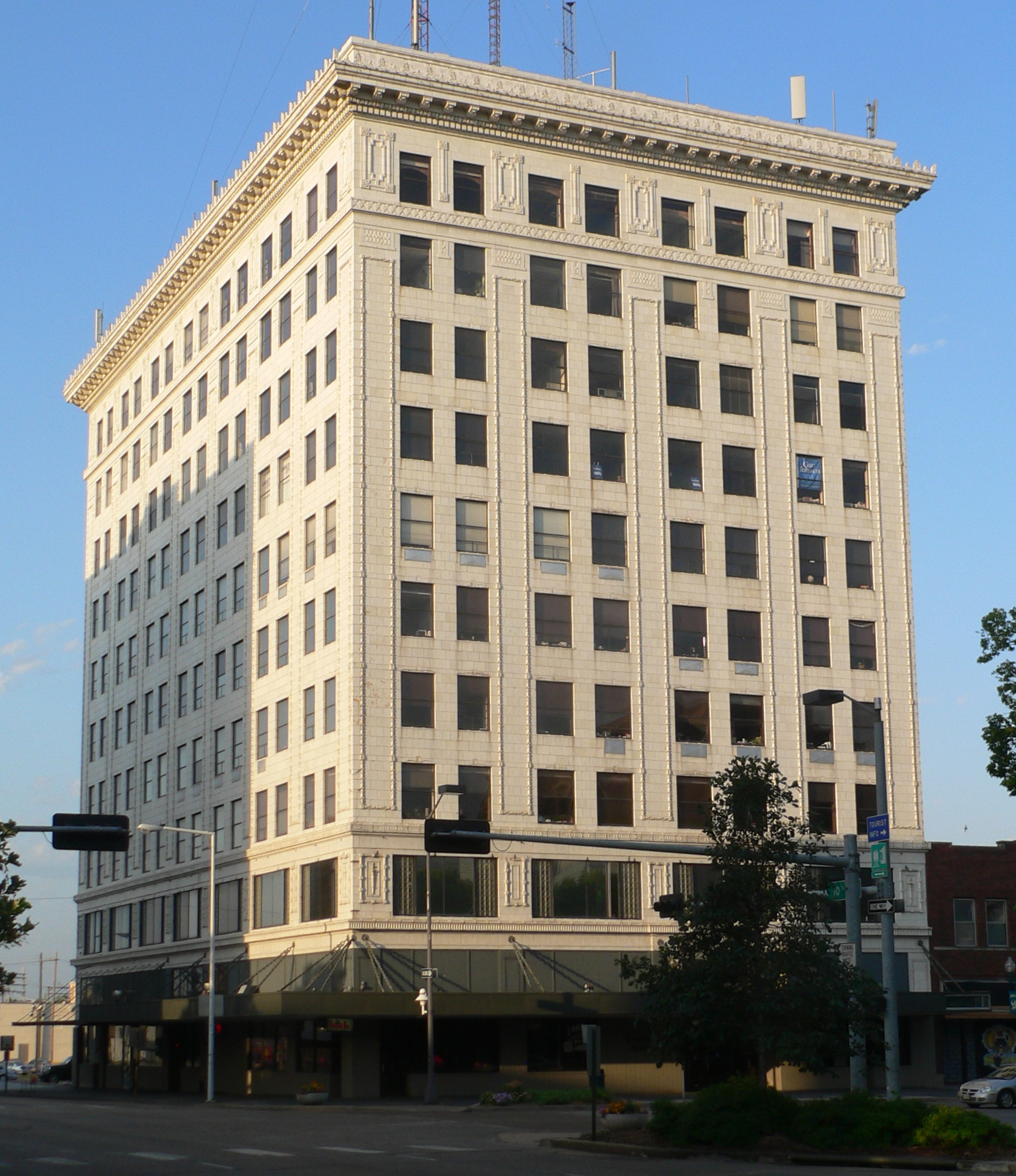
- Terminal Building, seen from the northeast.

- Location within Nebraska Location within the United States
- Location: 947 O St., Lincoln, Nebraska
- Coordinates: 40°48′48″N 96°42′26.35″W
- Area: less than one acre
- Built: 1916
- Architect: Hyland, Paul V.; Selden-Breck Construction Co.
- Architectural style: Chicago School, Commercial Style
- NRHP reference No.: 86003527
- Added to NRHP: December 29, 1986

The Terminal Building is a high-rise office building located at 947 O Street in Lincoln, Nebraska, built in 1916.

== History ==
The Terminal Building was designed by Chicago architect Paul V. Hyland in 1915. Hyland also designed three other historic buildings in Lincoln, the First National Bank building, the McAffee House, and the Frank H. Woods House. However, it may be the case that the building was actually designed by Joseph G. McArthur, an architect in Hyland's Lincoln office.

The building was built to serve as offices for the Lincoln Traction Company, a reorganized iteration of the Lincoln Street Railway Company which was founded in 1881. Lincoln Traction Company, which was owned by out-of-state investors, was the largest streetcar company in Lincoln and faced public scorn due to tax disputes and fare increases. In 1905, locals who were frustrated by the actions of Lincoln Traction Company founded Citizens Railway to create competition. Citizens Railway's bargaining tactics paid off. When the two companies merged in 1909, the board of directors was dominated by Lincoln locals and former directors of Citizens Railway.

The newly merged companies now controlled virtually all of Lincoln's streetcars. Throughout the early twentieth century, the company expanded, serving over 12,000,000 passengers a year. By the time the company began building its new office at the Terminal Building site, the company had its own electricity plant and produced enough to sell steam heat and electricity to customers.

The Terminal Building functioned as both an office space for the employees of the company and also as the terminal for the company's various streetcar lines. The lobby housed ticket counters and an electrical appliance store for passengers to peruse while waiting for their train.

The First World War, labor strikes, and the advent of buses slowly ate away at the profits of Lincoln Traction Company. By 1926, a holding company purchased Lincoln Traction Company to operate its electricity plant. By 1931, the company operated only three streetcar lines. In 1942, the bus line National City Lines purchased Lincoln Traction Company and discontinued the company name. The last streetcars operated in Lincoln in 1943.

The Terminal Building is one of the last remnants of the Lincoln Traction Company and of Lincoln's streetcar systems as most of the tracks were torn up during the Great Depression as Works Progress Administration projects.

=== Fire ===
In the early morning hours of February 19, 2018 firefighters responded to a three-alarm fire in the building. The fire was contained to the northwest corner of the eighth floor of the building, but smoke damage penetrated floors nine and ten while the water damage from the efforts to extinguish the fire damaged floors six and seven below. The first floor of the building, which is the most historically significant, remained largely unaffected.

== Architecture ==
The Terminal Building is a ten-story high-rise reinforced concrete office building. The structure is covered by a white-glazed terracotta facade on its north and east sides while the remaining south and west sides are covered with a brick facade.

Due to the building's flat roof, straight front and sides, lack of ornamentation and numerous, large windows, it can be considered an example of the Chicago School or Commercial Style of architecture. For this reason, it was listed on the National Register of Historic Places on December 29, 1986.

Most of the interior of the building has been updated, renovated, or otherwise changed except for first floor lobby area. The lobby features various types of marble in its flooring, pilasters, and wainscoting with plaster moldings, capitals, walls, and ceiling beams. Some original mahogany storefronts remain along with large French doors with "T" monograms. At the foot of the stairs leading to the second floor is a bronze plaque memorializing the building crew, architects, and Lincoln Traction Company officers and directors.
