= Lied Place Residences =

Residential high-rise in Lincoln, Nebraska, U.S.

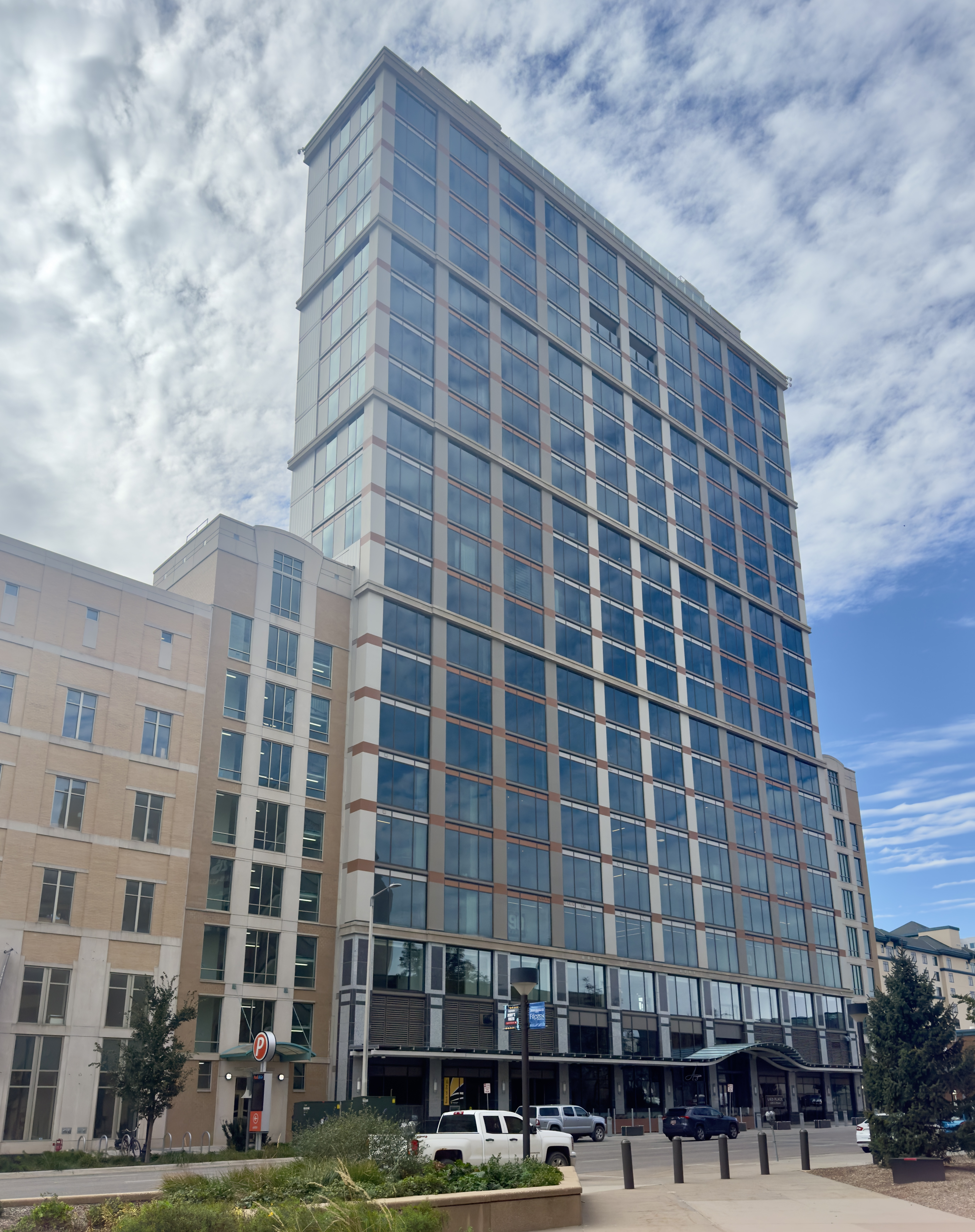
- Lied Place Residences in 2025
- Interactive map of the Lied Place Residences area

General information
- Location: Lincoln, Nebraska, U.S.
- Coordinates: 40.81573356870102°N 96.70486572318383°W
- Construction started: 2019
- Completed: 2022

Height
- Roof: 257 ft (78 m)

Technical details
- Floor count: 20

Other information
- Public transit access: StarTran

Lied Place Residences (often shortened to Lied Place) is a 257-foot (78 m) residential high-rise in Lincoln, Nebraska, United States. It is the second-tallest building in Lincoln, only surpassed by the Nebraska State Capitol. Originally slated to be completed in early 2021, the building opened in February 2022.

== History ==
In October 2018, a residential high-rise building was announced to be built in Downtown Lincoln. The building would succeed a former Applebee's, which closed in December 2013. The Lincoln Urban Design Committee approved of the project in 2018. The former Applebee's was demolished in the summer of 2019.

Ground was broken in September 2019, and construction began soon after. During construction in December 2019, a man died after metal forms fell onto him. The building was originally intended to open in early 2021. However, due to issues with ordering components during the COVID-19 pandemic. Residents began moving in during February 2022.
