= Tower Building (Little Rock, Arkansas) =

- U.S. National Register of Historic Places
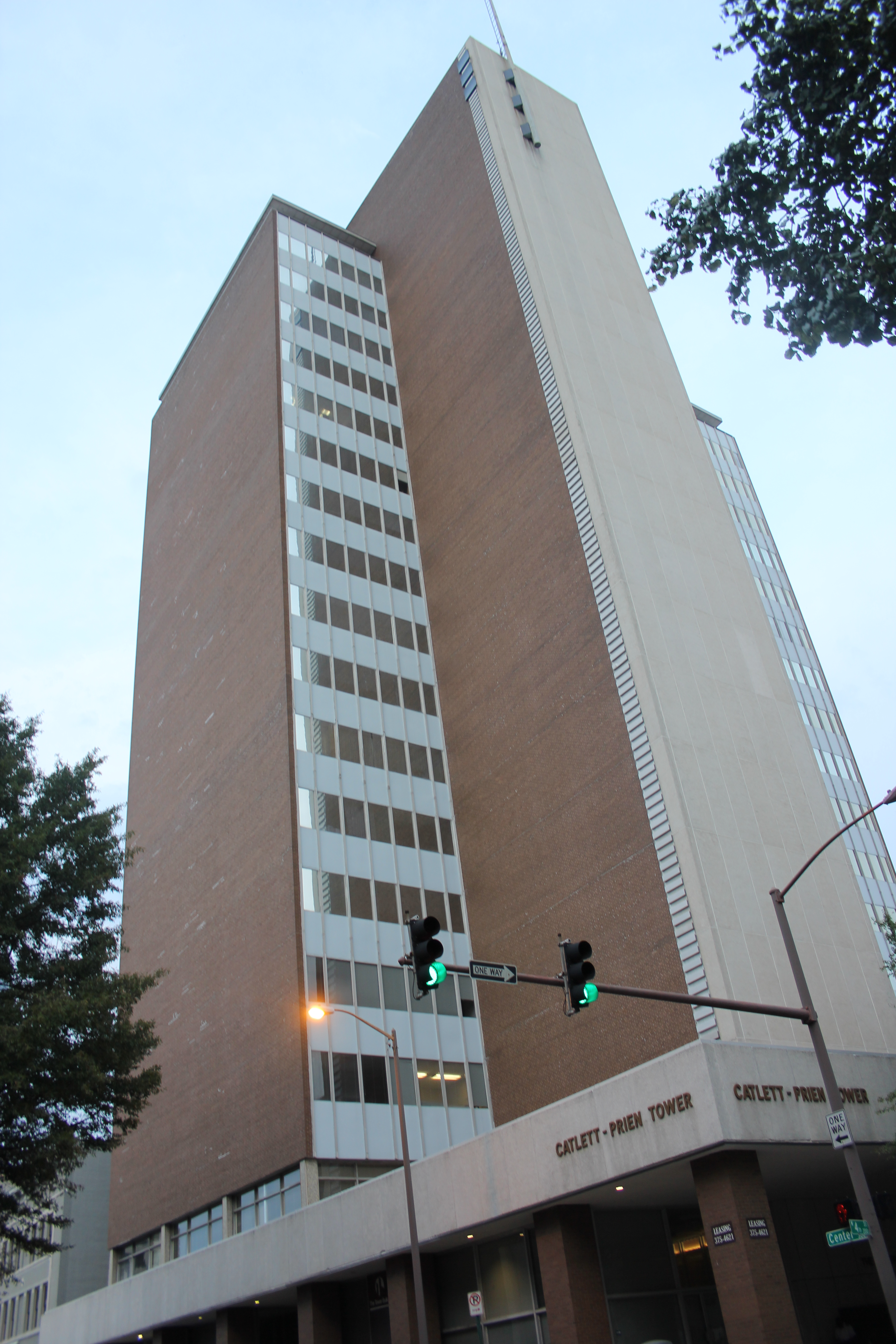

- Location within Arkansas Location within the United States
- Location: 323 Center St., Little Rock, Arkansas
- Coordinates: 34°44′44″N 92°16′24″W
- Area: less than one acre
- Built: 1959
- NRHP reference No.: 11000692
- Added to NRHP: September 23, 2011

The Tower Building is a commercial eighteen-story skyscraper at 323 Center Street in downtown Little Rock, Arkansas. Built in 1959–60, it was the tallest building in the state at the time of its completion, and the state's first instance of composite steel frame construction. It was designed by Little Rock architect F. Eugene Withrow and Dallas, Texas architect Harold A. Berry in the International style. It has curtain walls of windows on its north and south facades, and blank brick walls on the east and west, with the elevator tower projecting from its southern facade.

The building was listed on the National Register of Historic Places in 2011.

== See also ==
- National Register of Historic Places listings in Little Rock, Arkansas
