= Leo A. Daly =

American architecture firm

Leo A. Daly, LLC

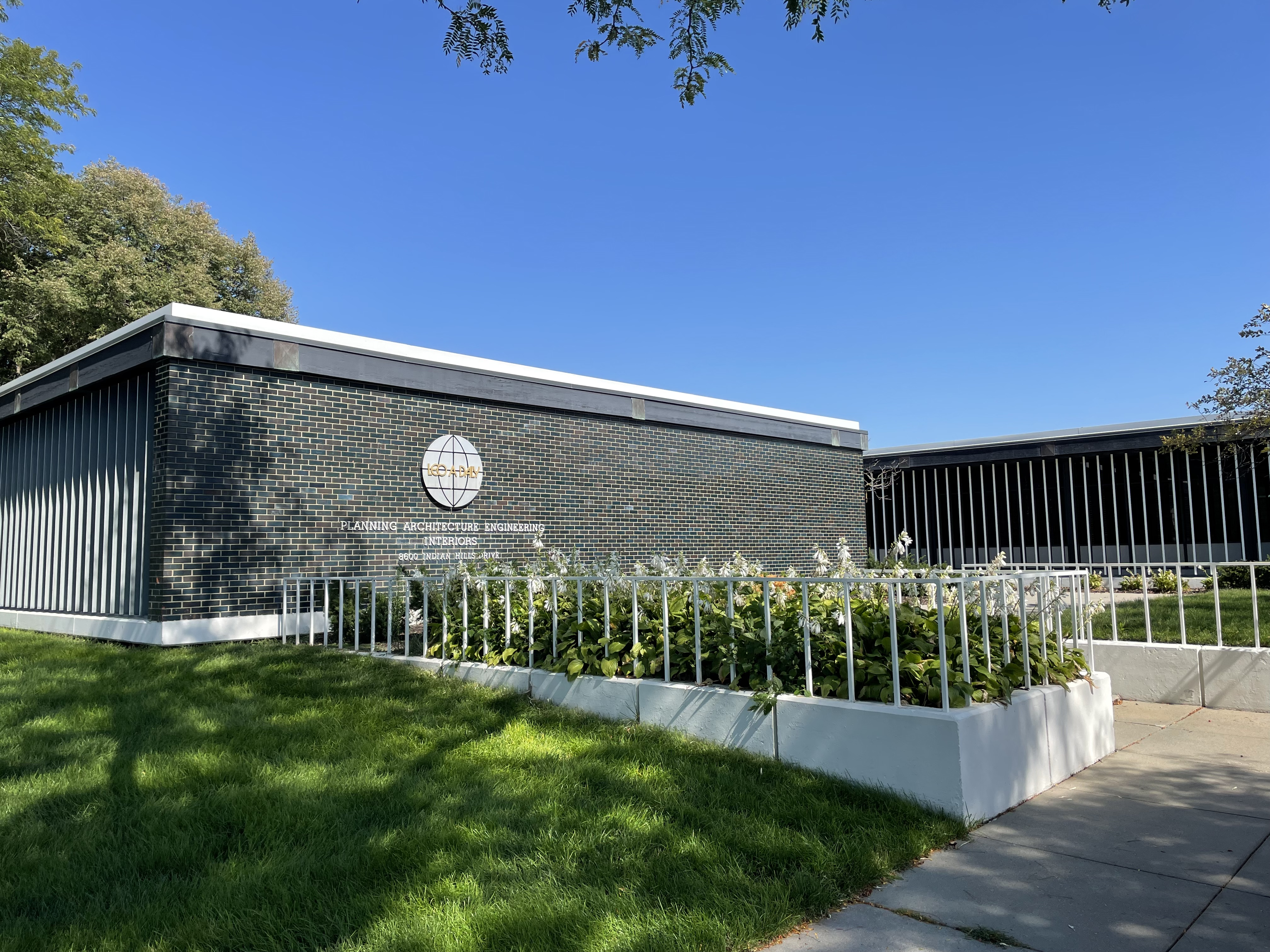
- Leo A. Daly's headquarters on Indian Hills Drive in Omaha
- Formerly: Leo A. Daly Company
- Type: Private
- Industry: Architecture, planning, engineering, interior design
- Founded: 1915; 111 years ago
- Founder: Leo A. Daly, Sr.
- Headquarters: Omaha, Nebraska, U.S.
- Area served: Worldwide
- Website: leoadaly.com

Leo A. Daly, LLC is an American architecture firm established in 1915 by Leo A. Daly, Sr. in Omaha, Nebraska, United States. Aside from architectural design, the firm also works in planning, engineering, interior design and program management.

== History ==
Founded in 1915, Leo A. Daly, LLC is a global architecture, engineering, interior design, and planning firm. Headquartered in Omaha, Nebraska, the company operates 12 studios (11 in the United States and one in Abu Dhabi, United Arab Emirates) and employs over 400 people.

In 2024, the firm transitioned from family ownership by entering a strategic partnership with Hennick & Company and establishing an employee-ownership model. In 2025, Leo A. Daly acquired Delawie, an architecture firm based in San Diego.

The firm operates across several sectors, including civic, education, public safety, federal, healthcare, commercial, industrial, hospitality, senior living, and aviation. It is led by CEO Edward G. Benes, PE, Esq., and an executive leadership committee of senior directors.

Leo A. Daly regularly appears in the top 50 of the Building Design + Construction industry rankings and has been frequently selected for Veterans Administration design projects.
