= Spirit (building) =

Proposed residential skyscraper in Australia

General information
- Status: Never built
- Location: 3 Trickett Street, Surfers Paradise, Gold Coast, Australia
- Groundbreaking: 2016
- Estimated completion: Project Cancelled
- Opening: Project Cancelled
- Cost: AUD$1.2 billion

Height
- Roof: 297.8 m (977 ft)
- Top floor: 284.6 m (934 ft)

Technical details
- Floor count: 89, plus 6 underground

Design and construction
- Architect: DBI Design Pty Ltd
- Developer: Forise Investments

Spirit, also known as Iluka, was a proposed residential skyscraper under construction on the Gold Coast in Queensland, Australia. Upon completion, it would have become the tallest building in Australia to roof, and the second tallest building overall (surpassed by the nearby Q1). The site was sold in March 2019 with only basement level work completed.

Proposed in 2015, the project was developed by Forise Investments and designed by DBI Design Pty Ltd. With a height of 297.8 metres (977 ft), Spirit was intended to become the third-tallest building in Australia overall, behind the nearby Q1, and by completion date the Australia 108 will come in as second, as well as the tallest building to roof, surpassing the Eureka Tower in Melbourne by 50 centimetres.

Spirit would have consisted of 470 residential apartments, across 89 levels, and would have further included 6 basement levels. The AUD$1.2 billion skyscraper received planning approval by the Gold Coast City Council in September 2015, with construction commencing at March 2016, and intended to finish by 2020.

In March 2019, Forise sold the site for $50–60 million at an estimated loss of $50 million, as Forise purchased the former Iluka tower for $65 million and then spent approximately $40 million on initial work at the basement level.

In February 2026, Altus Property Group and The Trump Organization announced the former Spirit from canceled and replaced by Trump International Hotel and Tower with height of 340 metres (1,120 ft) and 91 floors.

== See also ==
- List of tallest buildings on the Gold Coast
