= Stephen Cornelius Roberts =

American painter (born 1952)

- Born: 1952 (age 73–74); Omaha, Nebraska
- Education: University of Nebraska Omaha, BFA
- Known for: Painting, Portraiture
- Notable work: Nebraska State Capitol Memorial Chamber Murals

Stephen Cornelius Roberts (born 1952) is an American painter best known for his painting series of eight murals in the Memorial Chamber of the Nebraska State Capitol.

== Life and career ==
Stephen Cornelius Roberts was born in Omaha, Nebraska in 1952. Roberts’ original focus was as a serious musician and went to California to pursue a recording contract with a friend. In 1979 he switched his attention to art as his professional direction. Roberts graduated from the University of Nebraska Omaha, with a Bachelor of Fine Art degree in painting (under painter Peter Hill) in 1976.

Roberts became a full-time artist in 1979. In 1981, with advice and encouragement from Ivan Karp, he went to New York City to find a gallery and was accepted into a small gallery at the time. By October 1990, Roberts was represented by the Allan Stone Gallery in New York City (the gallery of artists such as Wayne Thiebaud, Richard Estes, and William Beckman). In February 1991, Allan Stone said of Roberts, ″I see a lot of figure painting. I think he [Roberts] is especially talented. Besides a strong technical facility, Roberts brings an essential sense of theatricality to his paintings as well as that elusive 'X quality' necessary to their success.″

Roberts' main subject matter is the human figure in narrative and portrait form. The figures in his paintings and drawings are typically life size or larger, some reaching 12 feet in height. Roberts' artwork has been exhibited throughout the country including Tête-À-Tête: Portraits In Dialogue at Allan Stone Projects, New York, NY; The Body Revealed: 200 Years of the American Nude, New Britain Museum of Art, New Britain, CT; The Perception of Appearance: A Decade of Contemporary American Figure Drawing, Frye Art Museum, Seattle, WA and Disrobed at Allan Stone Projects, New York, NY.

=== Influences and process ===
Roberts’ artistic influences are mostly from Greek and Roman Art and traditional European painting from the Renaissance onward. He works mainly from photographic references, but he does not grid or project them. He spends much of his time freehand drawing in the process of doing his paintings. Roberts’ painting process requires many thin layers of paint in order to achieve the desired effects and the work develops over months and sometimes years until completion. In his drawings he also spends much of the time layering. He usually uses pastel or conte with white highlights and works them up much like his paintings.

=== Nebraska State Capitol ===
In 1990, the Nebraska Capitol Mural Commission invited Roberts to participate in a mural competition for eight panels in the Nebraska State Capitol's Memorial Chamber on the 14th floor. Roberts competed against Vincent Desiderio of New York, Sidney Goodman of Philadelphia, and Jerome Witkin of New York. The commission awarded Roberts the eight-mural project on February 20, 1991. The State of Nebraska dedicated the murals on Veterans Day, November 11, 1996, and Roberts completed touch-ups in 1997.

The whole process was documented in a one-hour Nebraska Educational Telecommunications documentary entitled "Capitol Murals."

== Public Commissions by Roberts ==
=== Nebraska State Capitol, Memorial Chamber ===
- The Ideal of International Law (1996)
- The Perils of Fire (1996)
- The Ideal of Freedom (1996)
- The Scourge of Poverty (1996)
- The Ideal of Universal Peace (1996)
- The Scourge of Plague (1996)
- The Ideal of Self-Determination (1996)
- The Scourge of Famine (1996)

=== Norfolk Veterans’ Homes, Norfolk, Nebraska ===
- Veterans' Home mural (2001)

=== University of Nebraska–Lincoln, Othmer Hall ===
- Donald Othmer (2002)

=== University of Nebraska Medical Center, Sorrell Center ===
- The Physician (2008)
