= Nebraska State Capitol =

State capitol building of the U.S. state of Nebraska

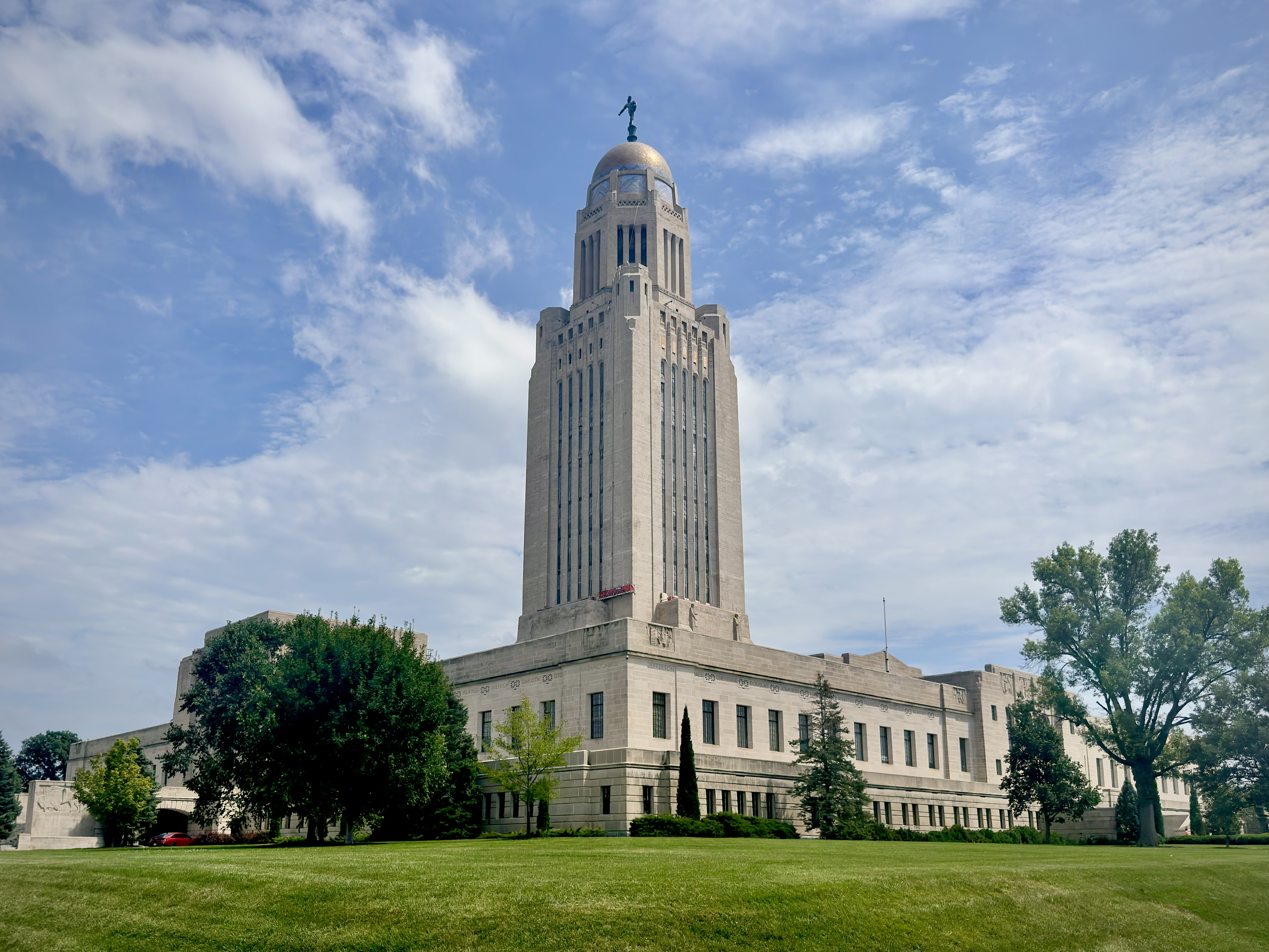
- View from the northwest in 2026
- Interactive map of the Nebraska State Capitol area

General information
- Architectural style: Art Deco; Neo-Byzantine; Gothic Revival
- Location: 1445 K Street; Lincoln, Nebraska, U.S.
- Coordinates: 40°48′29″N 96°41′59″W
- Groundbreaking: April 15, 1922; 104 years ago
- Completed: 1932; 94 years ago
- Cost: $9,800,449

Height
- Tip: 400 feet (122 m)
- Roof: 362 feet (110 m)
- Observatory: 245 feet (75 m)

Technical details
- Floor count: 15

Design and construction
- Architect: Bertram Grosvenor Goodhue

Other information
- Public transit: StarTran

U.S. National Register of Historic Places
- Official name: Nebraska State Capitol
- Designated: October 16, 1970
- Reference no.: 70000372

U.S. National Historic Landmark
- Designated: January 7, 1976

The Nebraska State Capitol is the seat of government of the U.S. state of Nebraska and is located in downtown Lincoln. Designed by New York architect Bertram Grosvenor Goodhue in 1920, it was constructed of Indiana limestone from 1922 to 1932. The capitol houses the primary executive and judicial offices of Nebraska and is home to the Nebraska Legislature—the only unicameral state legislature in the United States.

The Nebraska State Capitol's 400-foot (120 m) tower is the tallest building in the state outside of Omaha and can be seen twenty miles (32 km) away. It was the first state capitol to incorporate a functional tower into its design. Goodhue stated that "Nebraska is a level country and its Capitol should have some altitude or beacon effect." In 1976, the National Park Service designated the capitol a National Historic Landmark, and in 1997, the Park Service extended the designation to include the capitol grounds, which Ernst H. Herminghaus designed in 1932.

== Dimensions and features ==
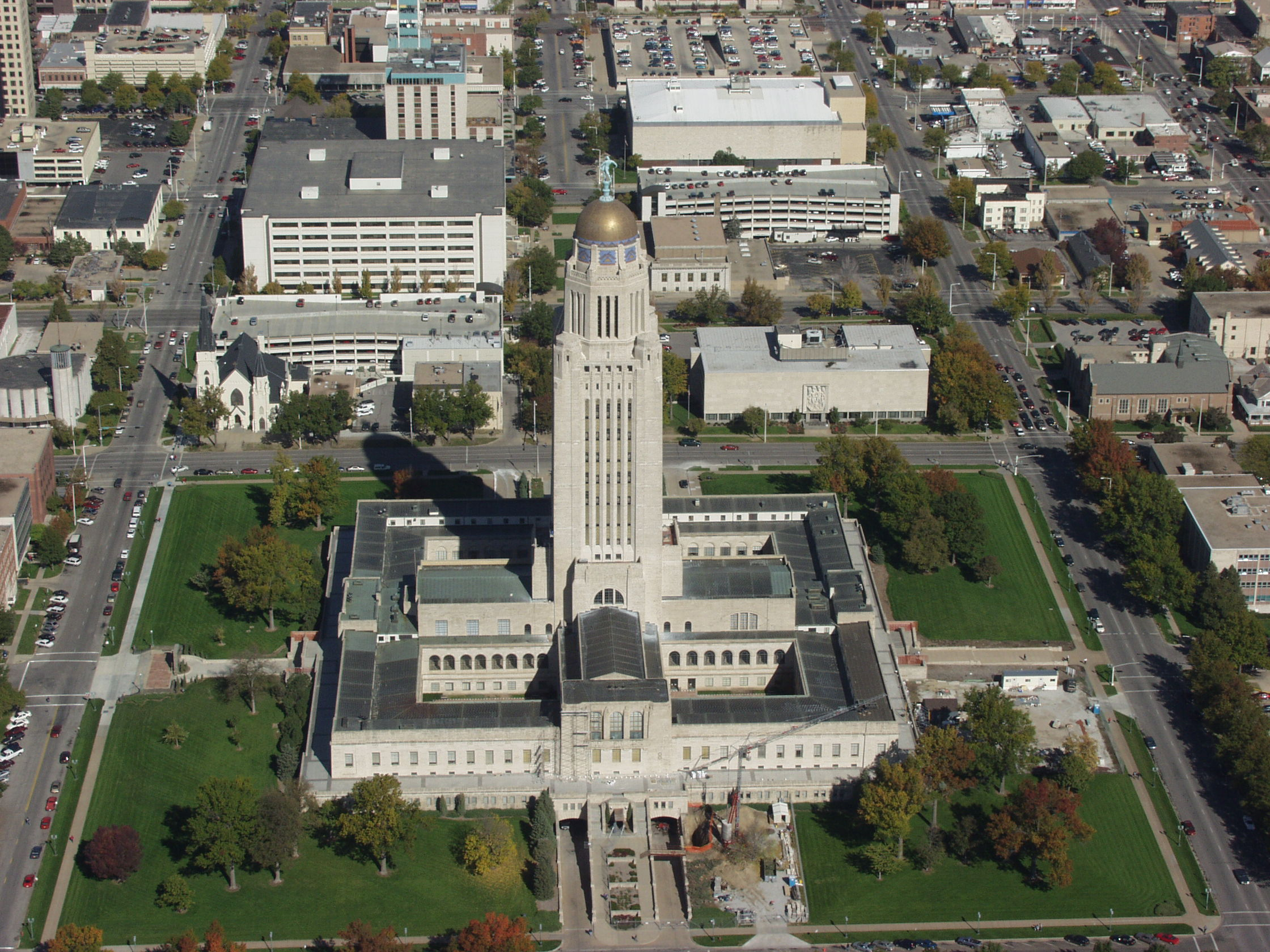
Aerial view from the south in 2002

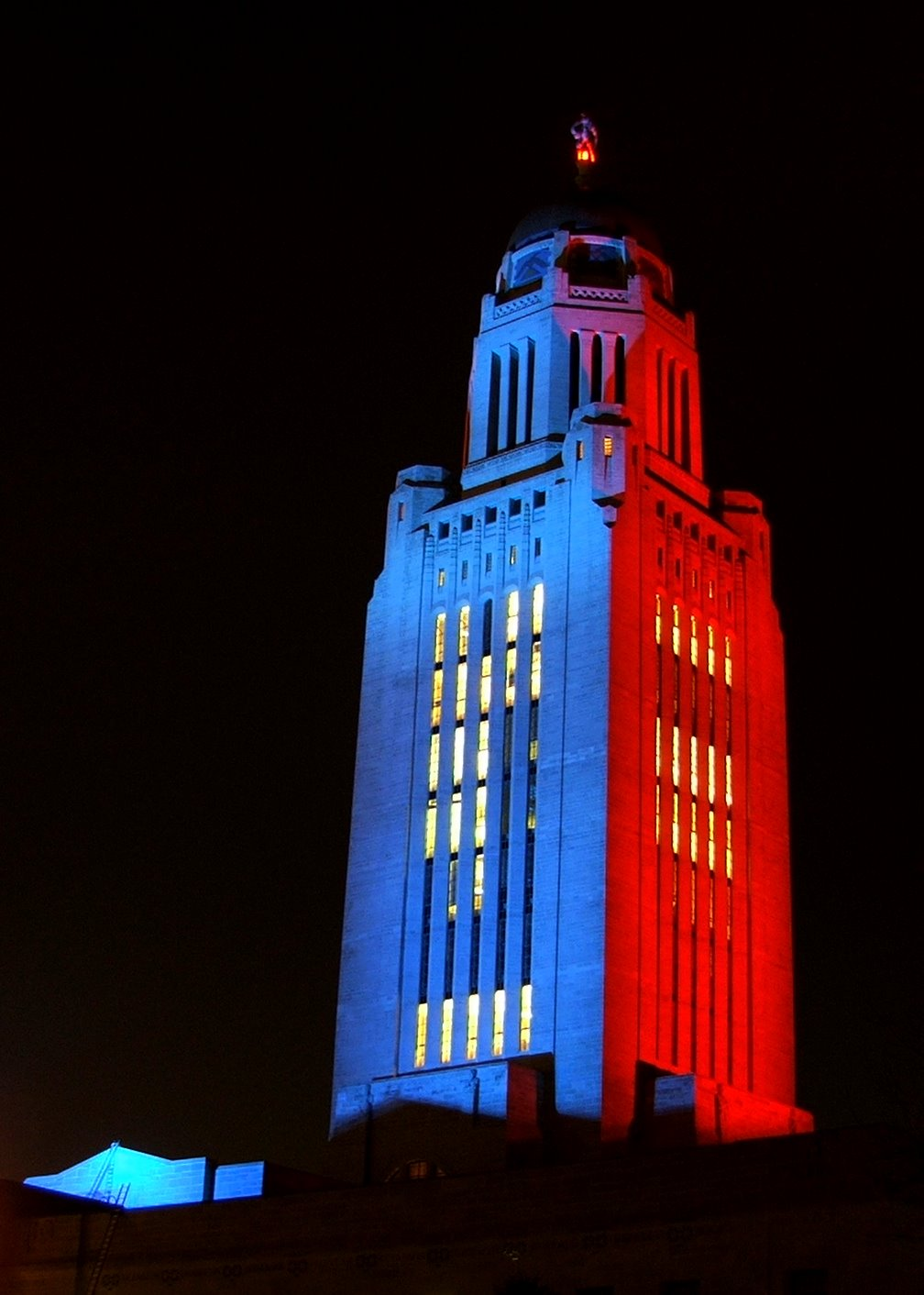
The capitol is sometimes illuminated various colors to honor causes.

The structure is anchored by a three-story, 437-foot (133 m) square base. This square base houses offices most frequently visited by the public. The second floor (main floor) is home to the office of the Governor of Nebraska, the Nebraska Supreme Court, the Nebraska Court of Appeals, and the Nebraska Legislature.

From the center of the base, a tower rises 362 feet (110 m), crowned by a gold-tiled dome. The finial—The Sower and its pedestal—add an additional 32 feet (9.8 m) to the building's height. Common measurements list the capitol at 400 feet (120 m), making it the second-tallest U.S. statehouse, surpassed only by the 450-foot (140 m) Louisiana State Capitol. (Note: Governor Huey Long insisted that the new Louisiana capitol be built taller than Nebraska's. The Louisiana State Capitol Building was constructed as part of Governor of Louisiana Huey Long's effort to upgrade the state's infrastructure. Shortly after taking office in 1928, he began planning the "new" Louisiana State Capitol building in Baton Rouge. Long instructed the well-known New Orleans architectural firm of Weiss, Dreyfous, and Seiferth to draft blueprints for the new building. Inspired by Long's wish for a tall building, the architectural firm looked to the design of Nebraska's State Capitol. No credible sources mention that Long insisted his building had to be taller than the Nebraska capitol. The 450-foot, 34-story steel-framed and limestone-clad building was completed in 1932.)

Goodhue originally envisioned much of the tower to house the collections of the Nebraska State Library, and he planned for each of the 17-foot (5.2 m) tower floors to include glass-floored stacks for book storage. As early as November 1920, however, Goodhue indicated that the tower could serve any purpose, including office space. By September 1925, the Capitol Commission decided that the tower should be built for office space. Tower floors continue to house various offices today.

In total, there are 15 stories in the capitol (three mechanical levels also exist within the tower between the 3rd and 4th floors). Memorial Chamber on the 14th floor—the highest publicly accessible level—has four observation decks that offer views of Lincoln from 245 feet (75 m) above the ground.

Lincoln Municipal Code places height restrictions on structures within the designated Capitol Environs District. This code helps to maintain the capitol's title as the tallest building in Lincoln. The capitol held the title of tallest building in Nebraska until 1969 with the completion of the 478-foot (146 m) Woodmen Tower in downtown Omaha. With the completion of Omaha's 634-foot (193 m) First National Bank Tower in 2002, the capitol became the third-tallest building in Nebraska.

== Previous capitol buildings ==
=== In Omaha ===
Congress officially opened Nebraska Territory with the passage of the Kansas–Nebraska Act of 1854. Almost instantly, a factional divide between North Platters (those living north of the Platte River) and South Platters (those living south of the Platte) arose over the question of capital location. Much to the chagrin of the South Platters, Acting Governor Thomas B. Cuming selected the small northern village of Omaha City for the seat of government. Cuming was from Iowa, and as his political allies were investors in the Council Bluffs and Nebraska Ferry Company, Omaha as the capital, would be beneficial to his personal political career. Results from the first territorial census, however, revealed 914 North Platters and 1,818 South Platters. The South Platters, with greater legislative representation, would be able to take the capital, but Cuming ignored proportional representation and assigned seven councilmen and fourteen representatives to the north and six councilmen and twelve representatives to the south. The North Platters, with greater political power, confirmed Omaha as the capital.

In Omaha, two structures served the Territory of Nebraska. The first was a two-story brick building donated by the Council Bluffs and Nebraska Ferry Company. This building, formerly located on 9th Street between Douglas and Farnam, served the Territorial Legislature for the sessions of 1855 and 1857. A second building, constructed in 1857–1858 on the site of present-day Omaha Central High School, served the remaining sessions of the Territorial Legislature and the first sessions of the State Legislature beginning in 1867.

=== In Lincoln ===
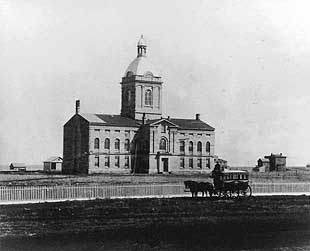
Nebraska's first state capitol, c. 1870.

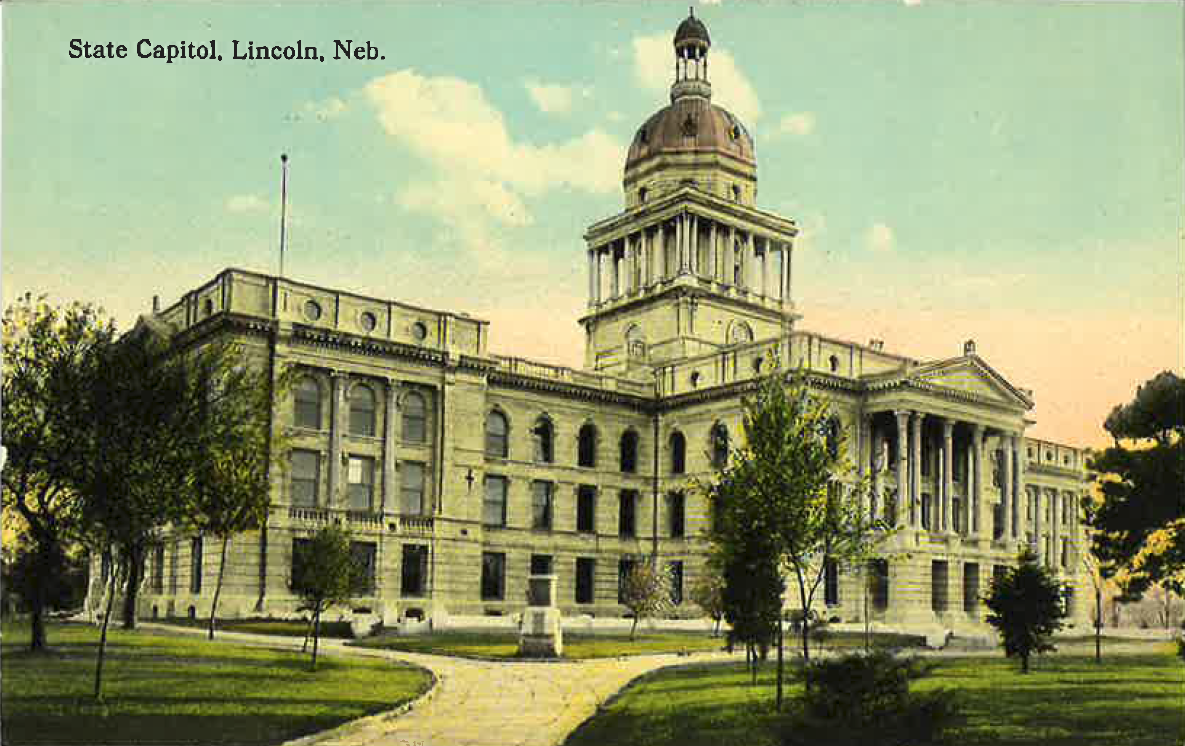
Postcard: Nebraska's second state capitol as viewed from the northeast corner, c. 1912.

In June 1867, the Third Session of the State Legislature passed Senate Bill Number 44, which "provid[ed] for the location of the Seat of Government of the State of Nebraska, and for the erection of public building thereat." The bill also created a commission (remembered as the Capital Commission) whose charge was to select a capital site somewhere within the boundaries of Seward County, the southern halves of Butler and Saunders counties, or the northern half of Lancaster County. On July 29, 1867, the Capital Commission selected the village of Lancaster as the capital city and renamed it Lincoln.

In Lincoln, two structures served the State of Nebraska. On October 10, 1867, the Capital Commission contracted Chicago architect John Morris to build a statehouse in Lincoln on the newly platted Capitol Square (bounded by the streets of 14th and 16th, H and K). Morris designed the capitol with local limestones which began to deteriorate upon the building's completion in late 1868.

By 1879, the State of Nebraska determined to replace its crumbling statehouse through piecemeal construction of a new capitol. Architect William H. Willcox designed a Renaissance Revival capitol, and the legislature appropriated $75,000 for construction of its west wing—finished in 1881. The same year, the legislature appropriated $100,000 for an east wing, which was finished in 1882. In 1883, the legislature authorized the Board of Public Lands and Buildings to raze the old capitol and construct the central portion of the Willcox design, not to exceed $450,000. The State of Nebraska finally completed its new, second state capitol in 1888. The second state capitol began to experience structural issues, especially in its foundation, within a couple of decades of its completion. After the building was deemed unsafe, the Nebraska Legislature made several attempts to fund the construction of a third state capitol.

== Current building ==
Nebraska Capitol Commission Members, 1919-1935
Member	Years served
Governors, ex officio
Samuel R. McKelvie	1919–1923
Charles W. Bryan	1923–1925, 1931–1935
Adam McMullen	1925–1929
Arthur J. Weaver	1929–1931
State Engineers, ex officio
George E. Johnson	1919–1923
Robert L. Cochran	1923–1935
Citizen members, appointed
William E. Hardy (Lincoln)	1919–1935
Walter W. Head (Omaha)	1919–1931
William H. Thompson (Grand Island)	1919–1935

On February 20, 1919, the Nebraska Legislature passed House Roll 3, which established the Nebraska Capitol Commission to oversee the construction of a new statehouse. The next day, Governor McKelvie signed the bill with its emergency clause and appointed the new commission. William E. Hardy, president of Hardy Furniture Company, and Walter W. Head, vice president of the Omaha National Bank, were Republicans from Lincoln and Omaha respectively. William H. Thompson, a prominent lawyer, was a Democrat from Grand Island. The three citizen members joined the ex officio members, Governor McKelvie and State Engineer George E. Johnson, to become the Nebraska Capitol Commission.

=== Financing ===
House Roll 3 declared that the cost of the capitol was not to exceed $5 million and established the Capitol Fund, which consisted of the proceeds of a special property tax. The Capitol Commission let the Capitol Fund accrue for two years before construction in order to have ample cash reserves. Throughout the construction of the capitol, the legislature extended the levy and ultimately raised the spending limit to $10 million. The Nebraska State Constitution limits state indebtedness, so most state projects must be funded on a "pay-as-you-go" basis. The State of Nebraska funded the capitol under the same principles, and the final cost, $9,800,449.07 (equivalent to $224,244,741 in 2024), was completely paid when the Capitol Commission dissolved in 1935.

=== Competition program ===
One of the Capitol Commission's first actions was to hire Omaha architect Thomas Rogers Kimball as its professional advisor. Kimball, who was president of the American Institute of Architects, devised a two-stage competition for the selection of a capitol architect. In the preliminary stage, the commission invited Nebraska architects to submit capitol designs and hired Irving Kane Pond to serve as judge. Together, Pond and the commission selected Ellery L. Davis (Lincoln), John Latenser & Sons (Omaha), and John McDonald and Alan McDonald (Omaha) to compete in the final stage. Next, the commission opened the final stage to nationally known architects, including: Bliss & Faville (San Francisco), Bertram Grosvenor Goodhue (New York), H. Van Buren Magonigle (New York), McKim, Mead, and White (New York), John Russell Pope (New York), Tracy & Swartwout (New York), and Paul Cret and Zantzinger, Borie and Medary (Philadelphia).

Kimball wrote an innovative competition program that did not dictate plan, style, or material for the capital. The program did state, however, the commission's desire that the architect collaborate with "sculptor, painter, and landscapist" to create a unified design. Finally, Kimball organized the competition so that the jury was selected only after the ten competitors had submitted their designs to the Capitol Commission. The designs were identified by numbers, and "separate sealed envelopes contained the architects' names and plan numbers". Next, the Capitol Commission chose the first of three competition jurors, Waddy Butler Wood; the competitors chose the second, James Gamble Rogers; and Wood and Rogers chose the third, Willis Polk. On June 26, 1920, the jury chose the author of the design "Number 4" as the architect of the Nebraska State Capitol. The author of design "Number 4" was Bertram Grosvenor Goodhue.

=== Goodhue's design ===
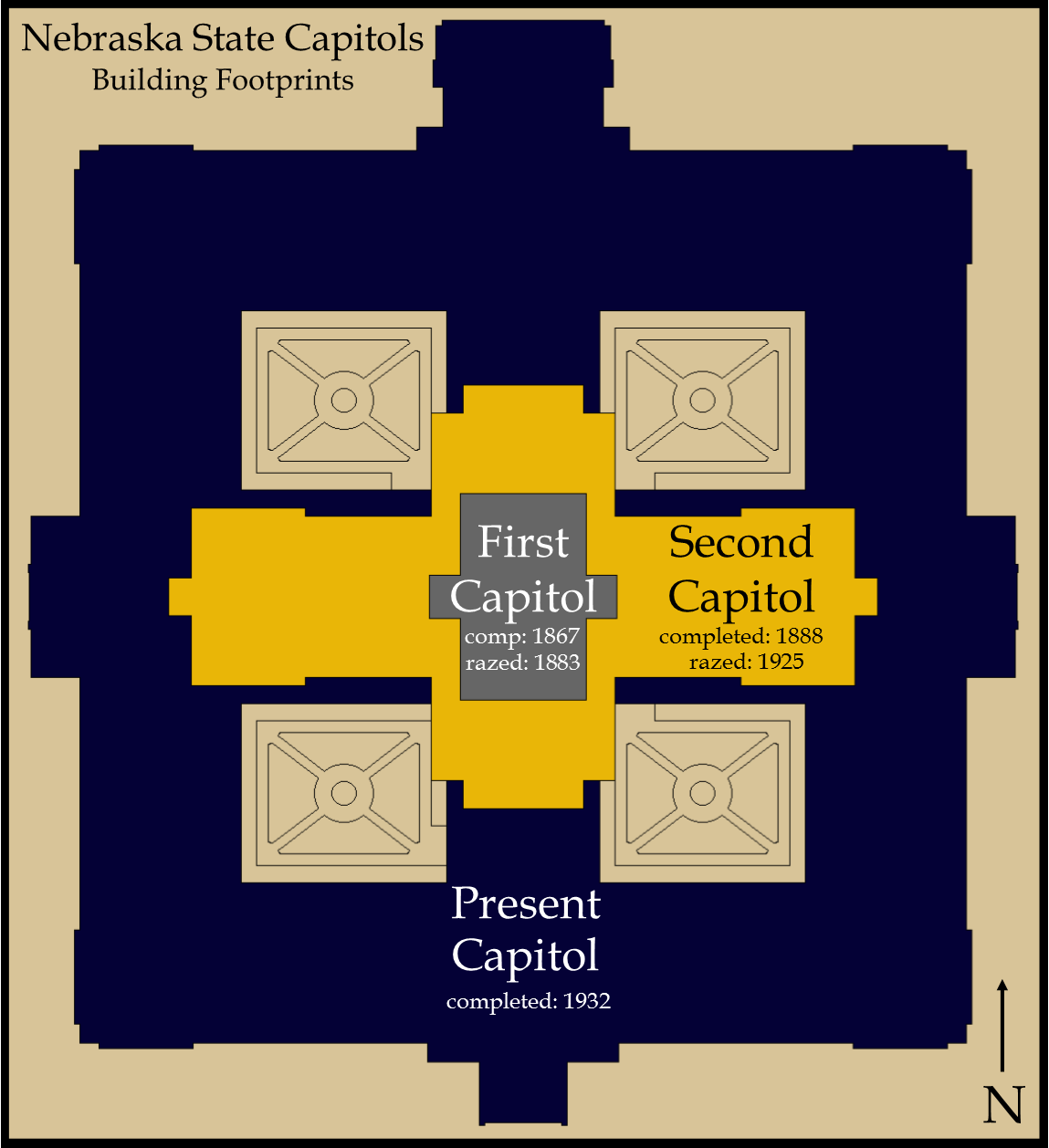
Comparison of the footprints of the three Nebraska State Capitols.

Goodhue designed the Nebraska State Capitol in a roughly Classical architectural style, and he felt "impelled to produce something quite unlike the usual...thing of the sort, with its veneered order and invariable Roman dome". Goodhue employed Classical principles of geometric form and hierarchical arrangement but eliminated the traditional use of columns, pediments, and domes. In addition to the restrained Classical vocabulary, Goodhue mixed elements of Achaemenid, Assyrian, Byzantine, Gothic, and Romanesque architecture.

Goodhue was a well-established church architect. He designed St. Bartholomew's Church (New York), the West Point Cadet Chapel, and the Church of the Intercession (New York). The Nebraska State Capitol features similar church vocabulary. The plan is a modified cross-in-square plan enclosed by a 437-foot (133 m) square. Four arms radiate from a central domed rotunda, upon which rises the tower with its unarticulated windows and flat surfaces—much like an enlarged spire.

=== Construction ===
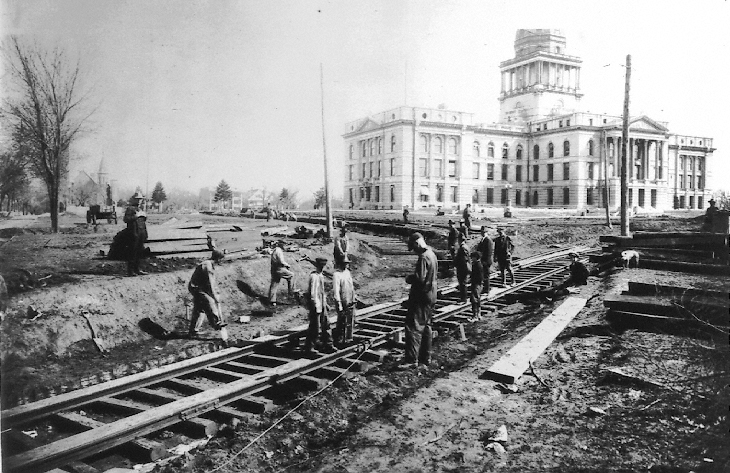
Workers lay track for the Capitol Railroad around the second state capitol, March 1922.

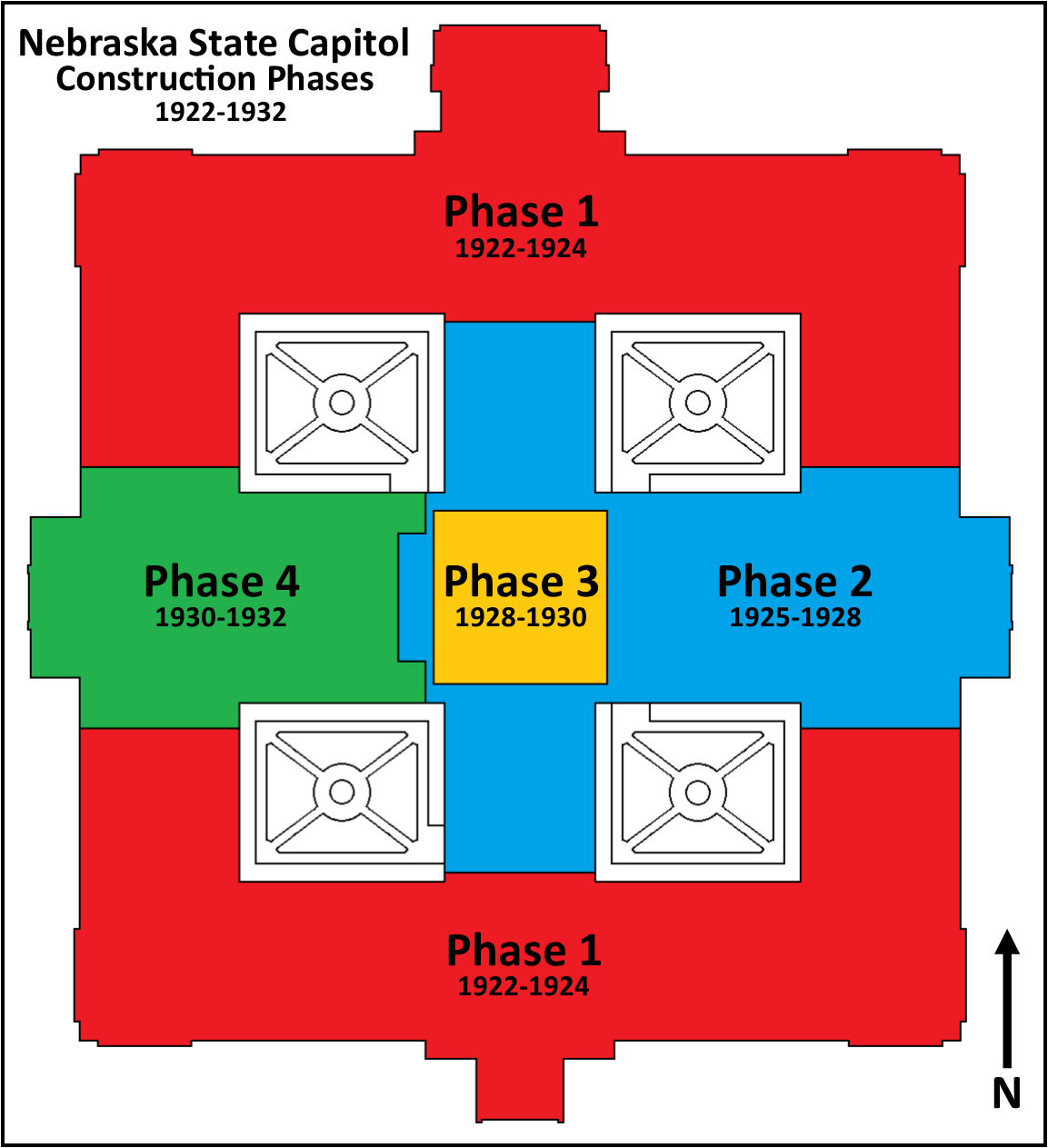
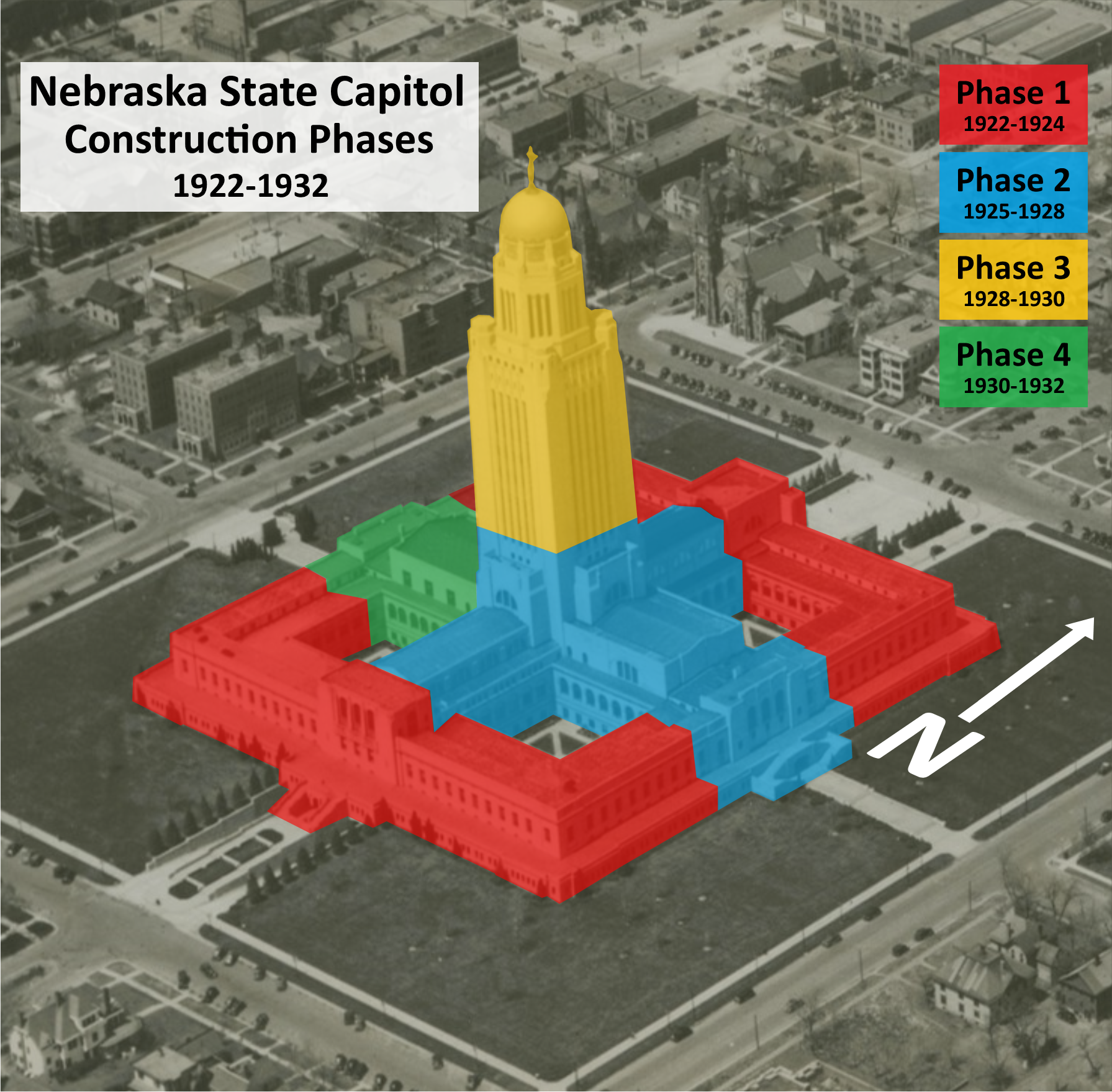
Plan and photographic illustrations of the four phases of construction of the Nebraska State Capitol, 1922–1932.

In March 1922, the Capitol Commission built an electric railroad spur from Lincoln's Burlington yards. The state-owned line ran along H Street from 7th to 14th Streets and provided an easy means for delivery of construction materials. Then on April 15, 1922, Governor Samuel R. McKelvie ceremonially broke ground, thus beginning a ten-year construction process which occurred in four phases. Building in phases allowed construction to commence before demolition of the old statehouse. With the completion of the capitol's Phase 1 in 1924, state operations moved into the new structure. The old capitol was subsequently razed. On April 23, 1924—just two years into the capitol's construction—Bertram Goodhue died, and his associates formed a firm, Bertram Grosvenor Goodhue Associates, to finish the capitol and other ongoing Goodhue projects. After construction ended in 1932, the Capitol Commission hired Lincoln landscape architect Ernst Herminghaus to design the grounds.

Capitol Construction, 1922–1932
Phase	Years	Construction Activity
One	1922–1924	After the groundbreaking, the north and south sections of the square base were built around the former capitol, allowing state operations to continue inside. This saved the state money in temporary off-campus rentals. With the completion of Phase 1 in late 1924, the state moved its offices from the old capitol to the new. The old statehouse was razed in April 1925.
Two	1925–1928	The east side of the square base, along with the north, east, and south arms were completed. The tower was also constructed to the 6th floor—the level above the main rotunda.
Three	1928–1930	The tower was completed. On April 24, 1930, thousands of spectators gathered around the west side of the capitol to watch the ascent of the tower's finial—The Sower.
Four	1930–1932	The west side of the square base and the west arm were completed.

=== Integrated art program ===
Bertram Goodhue employed two New York artists, Lee Lawrie and Hildreth Meière, in both the exterior and interior ornamentation of the Nebraska State Capitol. Lawrie, a sculptor, designed all of the engaged relief panels and buttress figures of the exterior, along with interior column capitals, doors, and fireplace surrounds. Meière, a muralist, designed the marble mosaic floor panels and the ceramic tile panels of the vaults.

On January 20, 1922, the Capitol Commission requested Goodhue to consult with Hartley Burr Alexander, of the University of Nebraska's department of philosophy, "to work out the inscriptions to be used on the Capitol Building." In addition to the inscriptions, Alexander began to work closely with Goodhue and Lawrie on the themes of the exterior sculptures. When Goodhue died in 1924, Alexander feared that the thematic development in future portions of the capitol would be inconsistent with the established schemes. He therefore wrote an overarching thematic program, "Nebraska State Capitol: Synopsis of Decorations and Inscriptions," in July 1926. (Note: McCready reprinted the majority of Alexander's "Nebraska State Capitol: Synopsis of Decorations and Inscriptions" in Appendices V and VI of his 1974 article, "The Nebraska State Capitol: Its Design, Background and Influence.") Alexander's synopsis thus served as a guide for the remaining interior and exterior decorations, and Alexander was bestowed with the title of Thematic Consultant.

=== Later history ===
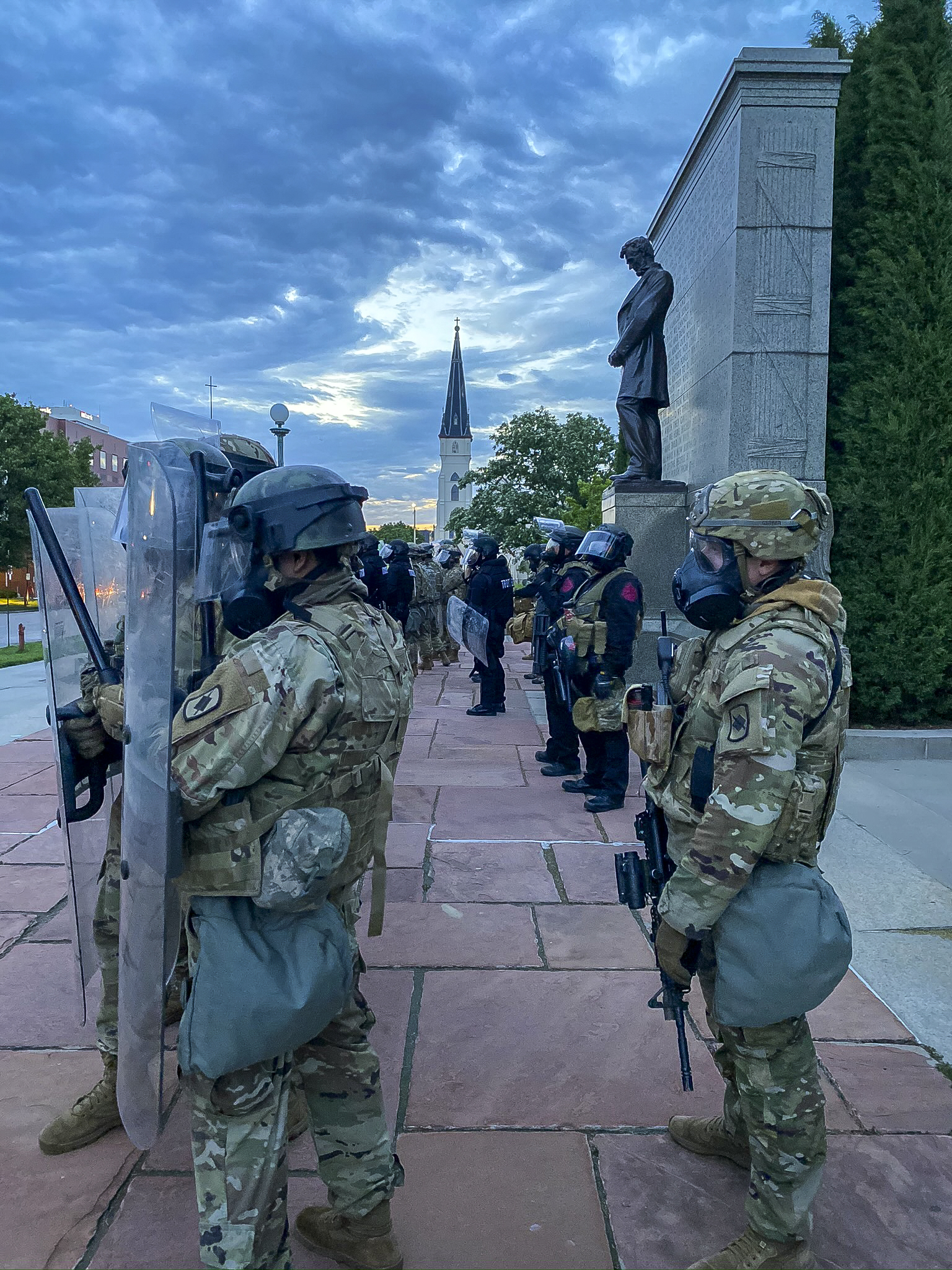
Nebraska National Guard and state troopers at the capitol on May 31, 2020, during the George Floyd protests

Because of its prominent tower the capitol is popularly nicknamed "Tower on the Plains" or "Penis of the Plains".

The capitol and its grounds are frequent sites of political demonstrations, rallies, and news conferences.

- July 1934: Lincolnites sleep on capitol lawn during heatwave; Capitol Commission worries blankets will kill grass
- January 16, 1935: Dan Hellweg dies after jumping from the fourteenth floor
- June 13, 1935: Mari Sandoz receives telegram at her Nebraska State Historical Society office on the ninth floor announcing that she won the Atlantic Monthly Press nonfiction contest for her biography Old Jules
- October 10, 1936: President Franklin D. Roosevelt addresses a crowd of 30,000 in front of the north entrance
- November 13, 1945: Roy Kohler dies after falling or jumping from the fourteenth floor
- December 31, 1948: State installs wire fencing above parapet wall of the fourteenth floor observation decks to prevent falls or jumps
- May 29, 1954: Dick Cavett "sloshes" white paint on the statue of William Jennings Bryan, which stands on the capitol's north plaza
- February 12, 2001: Same-sex couples hold wedding ceremonies on the west steps of the capitol, showing support for legalization of same-sex marriage as a part of National Freedom to Marry Day.
- April 10, 2002: Nebraska Coalition for LGBT Civil Rights organizes a human chain around the capitol in protest of Nebraska Initiative 416.
- July 17, 2004: Neo-nazis hold a rally at the north steps of the capitol. The rally was opposed by a far larger anti-Nazi counterprotest.
- July 12, 2005: The body of James Exon lay in state in the capitol rotunda.
- May 30–31, 2020: Police fire CS gas and rubber bullets at Black Lives Matter demonstrators protesting police brutality at the capitol and on Lincoln Mall, to the west of the building. While protestors had their hands up, police shot them in the face; one was blinded and another suffered a shattered nose.

== Exterior ==
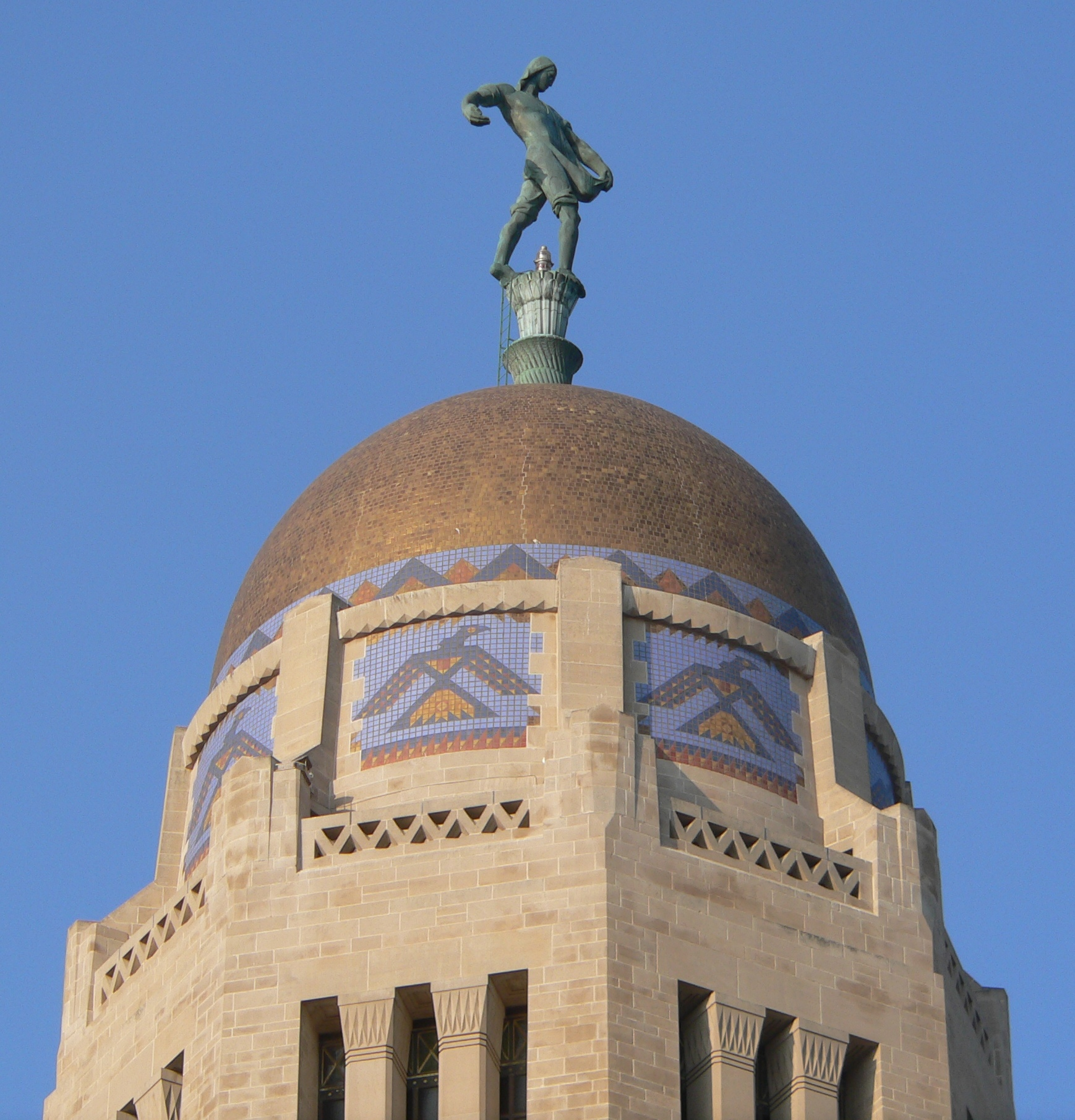
Capitol's drum with band of thunderbird mosaics, gold-tiled dome, and The Sower.

The exterior of the Nebraska State Capitol is architecturally composed of two parts: the three-story, 437-foot (133 m) square base and the 400-foot (120 m) tower. Alexander envisioned the base, with its inner cross, as an emblem of the quarters of the Earth representing the drama of human experience, and he envisioned the tower as Earth's gnomon representing human ideals. The Sower—the 19.5-foot (5.9 m) finial atop the capitol's gold-tiled dome—completes the vertical movement of the exterior symbolism representing agriculture and the "chief purpose in forming society, to sow nobler ideas of living".

Lee Lawrie designed the principal exterior decoration, representing the history of Western law. The Sower, his best-known work at the capitol, is the only work there that is in the round, or free-standing. The remaining ornamentation is engaged within the building's limestone in bas-relief, pierced, and buttress form. After Lawrie finalized his designs in plaster maquettes, the Edward Ardolino stone-carving contractor employed Alessandro Beretta to execute the carving in situ. Beretta would take as long as ten weeks per panel and use as many as 70 different tools. He finished the carving on November 19, 1934.

=== The Main Portal ===
The main portal introduces the sculpted ornamentation representing the foundation of life on the Great Plains. Two parapets adorned with relief panels of bison flank the main stairs. The bison represent Plains Indians indigenous to Nebraska, and the principal nations are inscribed within the panels (alphabetically):

- Arapahoe
- Arikara
- Cheyenne
- Kiowa
- Pawnee
- Ponca
- Omaha
- Otoe
- Sioux
- Winnebago

19th-century European Americans are also represented above the main entrance with the gilded relief, Spirit of the Pioneers. The relief sits directly atop Alexander's inscription: "The Salvation of the State is Watchfulness in the Citizen." Additionally, an inscription at the crown of the main portal reads: "Wisdom, Justice, Power, and Mercy, Constant Guardians of the Law." Four buttress figures flank the inscription representing the aforementioned guardians.

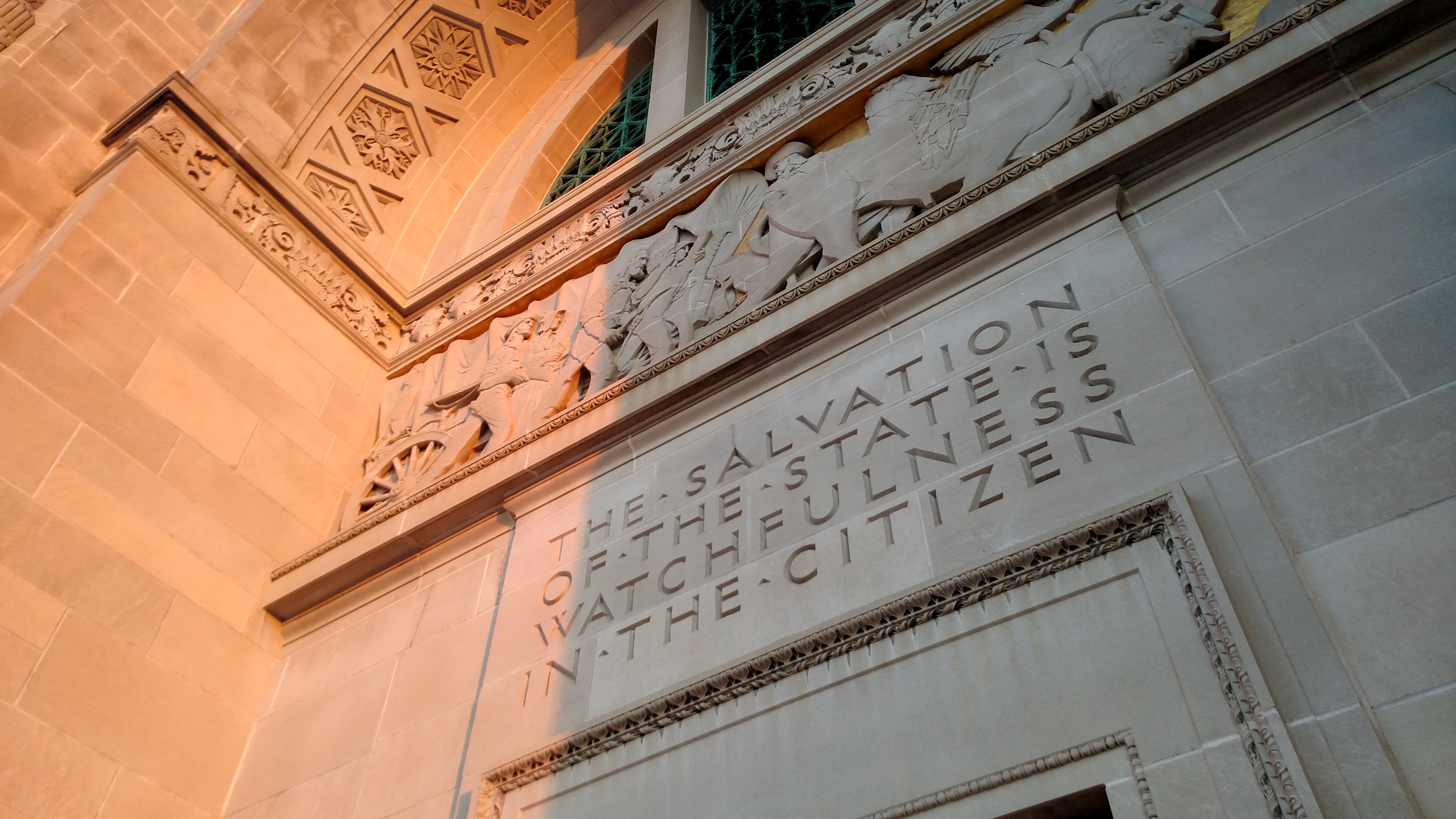
Inscription over north entrance

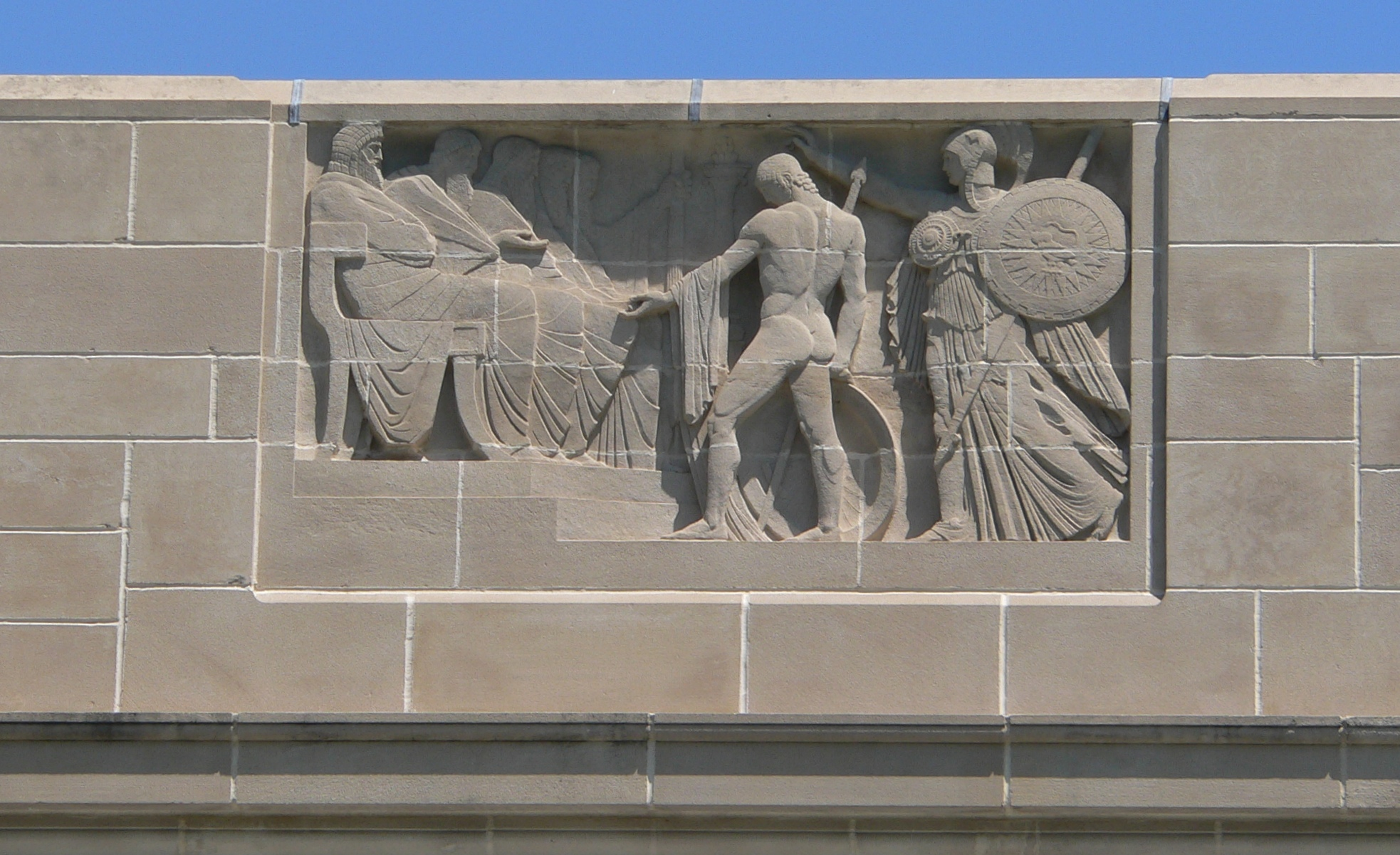
Lee Lawrie. Orestes Before the Areopagites. 1924. West facade.

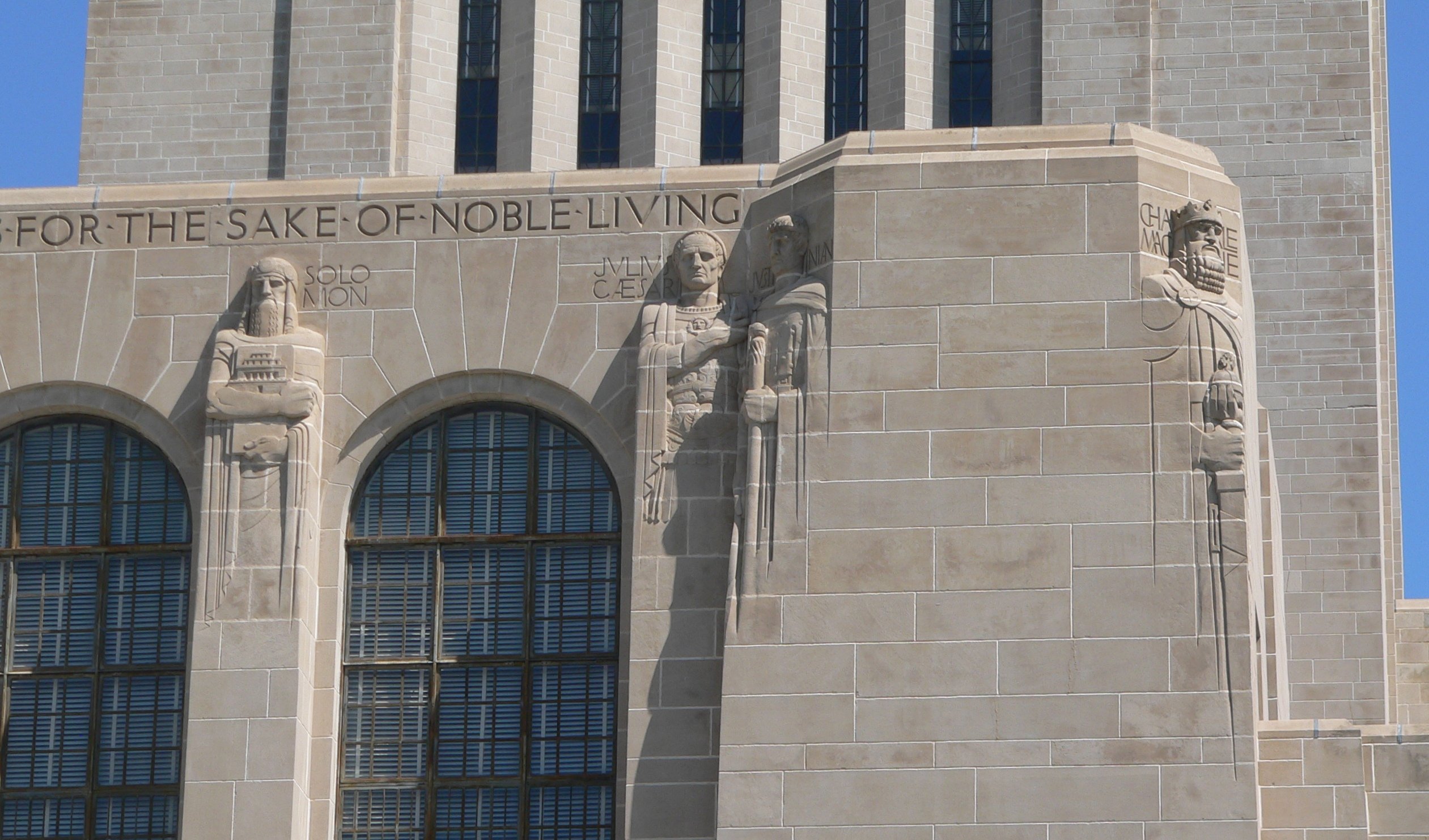
Lee Lawrie. Solomon, Julius Caesar, Justinian and Charlemagne. 1925. South arm.

=== The Promenade Circuit ===
The names of the ninety-three counties of Nebraska are inscribed along the top of the base of the capitol and are loosely grouped by number of letters per name. Directly above the county names, twenty-one panels (eighteen bas-reliefs, three pierced) represent the creation of law. The panels are best observed from the promenade, beginning on the northwest corner of the building:

Hebrew Law: Northwest

- Moses Bringing the Law from Sinai
- Deborah Judging Israel
- The Judgement of Solomon

Greco-Roman Law: West

- Solon Giving a New Constitution to Athens
- The Publishing of the Twelve Tables in Rome
- The Establishment of the Tribunate of the People

Greco-Roman Law: Southwest

- Plato Writing His Dialog on the Ideal Republic
- Orestes Before the Areopagites
- The Codification of Roman Law under Justinian

Historical Documents: South (pierced panels)

- The Signing of the Declaration of Independence
- The Magna Carta
- The Writing of the Constitution of the United States

English Law: Southeast

- The Codification of Anglo-Saxon Law under Ethelbert
- Milton Defending Free Speech before Cromwell
- Burke Defending America in Parliament

Freedom in America: East

- Las Casas Pleading the Cause of the Indian
- The Signing of the Pilgrim Compact on the Mayflower
- Lincoln and the Emancipation Proclamation

Nebraska Law: Northeast

- The Purchase of Louisiana from Napoleon
- The Kansas-Nebraska Bill
- The Admission of Nebraska as a State in the Union

Ten buttress sculptures along the top of the capitol's south arm represent the great western lawgivers. The buttress figures are depicted in chronological order from west to east and are best observed from the south steps, with the exception of the first and the last. The figures of Minos and Napoleon are best observed from the northwest and northeast courtyards, respectively:

- Minos
- Hammurabi
- Moses
- Akhnaton
- Solon
- Solomon
- Julius Caesar
- Justinian
- Charlemagne
- Napoleon

=== The Tower ===
Eight buttress sculptures around the base of the tower represent the ideals of culture. The buttress figures are best observed from within the four courtyards or at a distance from the sidewalk around the building:

Northwest

- Pentaour: Dawn of History
- Ezekiel: Cosmic Tradition

Southwest

- Socrates: Birth of Reason
- Marcus Aurelius: Reign of Law

Southeast

- St. John the Apostle: Glorification of Faith
- Louis IX: Age of Chivalry

Northeast

- Isaac Newton: Discovery of Nature
- Abraham Lincoln: Liberation of Peoples

=== Landscape ===
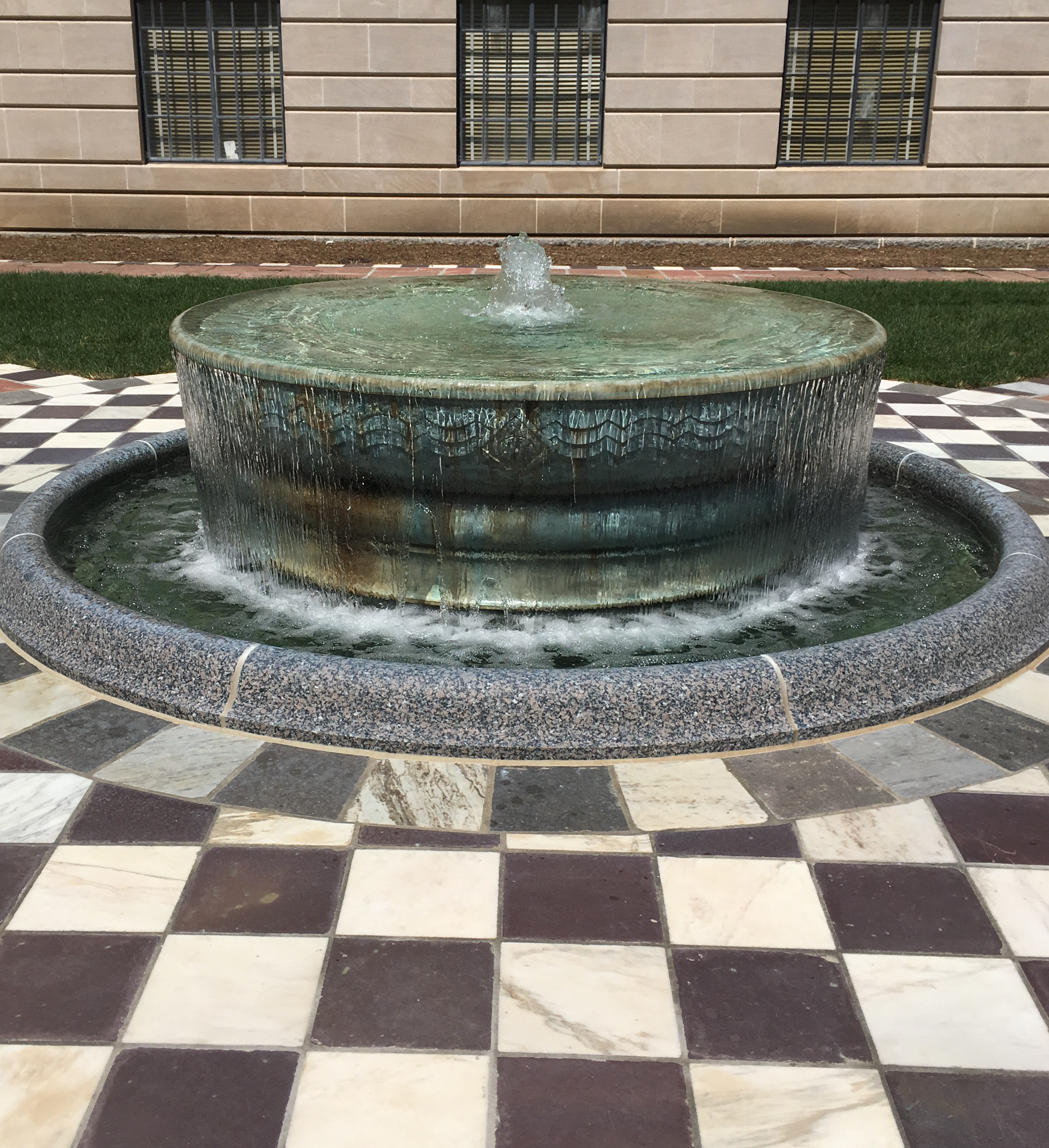
Southeast courtyard fountain, 2017.

In May 1933, under ever-worsening economic conditions, the Nebraska Legislature re-appropriated the Capitol Commission's unexpended budget. With depleted funds, the commission resolved to terminate its own existence, leaving some projects like the interior murals and the courtyard fountains incomplete. In 2017, the State of Nebraska installed the originally planned cast-bronze fountains in each of the capitol's four courtyards using the Goodhue Associates' original designs.

=== Lincoln Monument ===
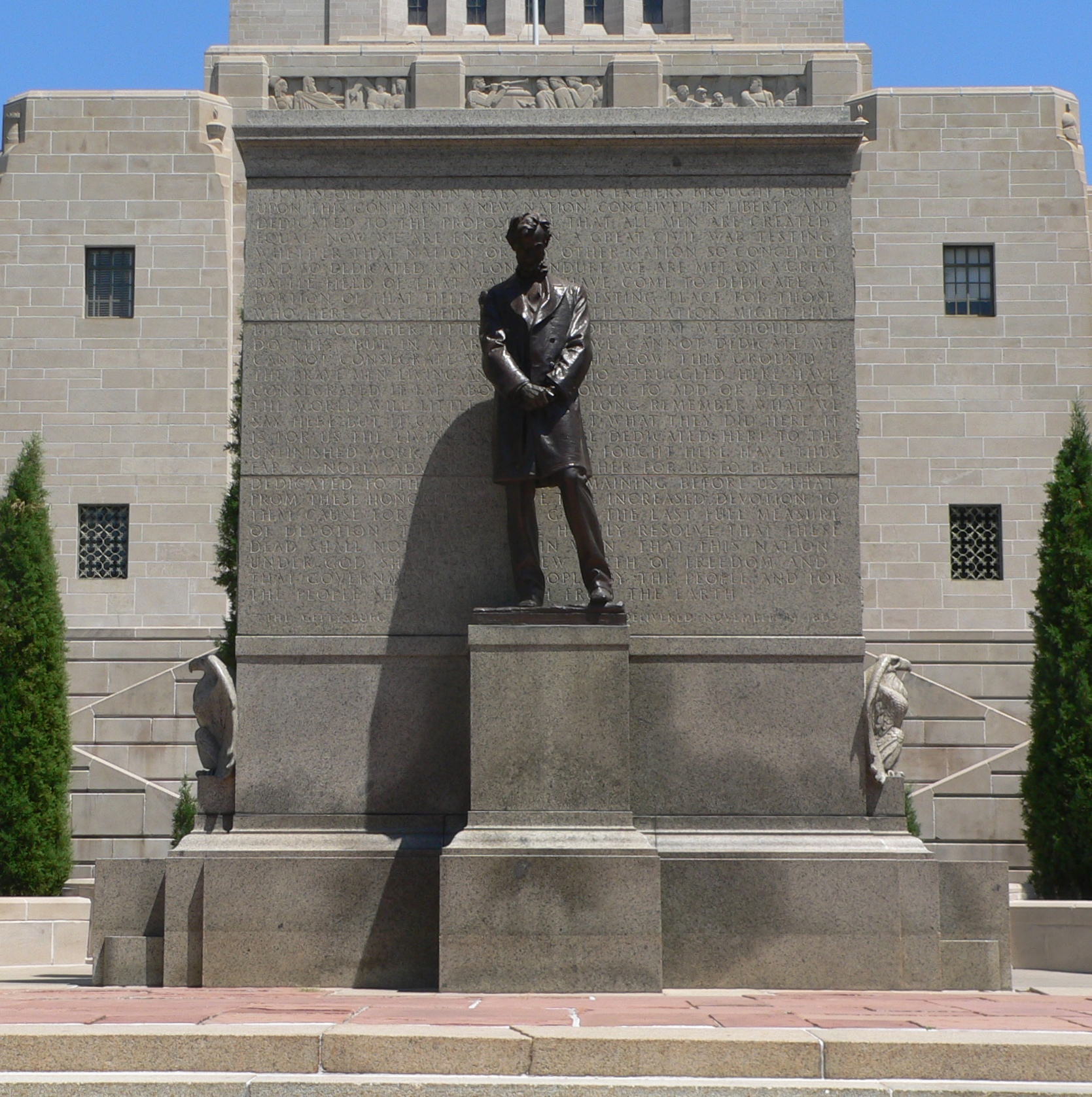
Daniel Chester French (sculptor) and Henry Bacon (architect). Lincoln Monument. 1912.

The Lincoln Monument, located on the capitol's west grounds, is composed of the 8.67-foot (2.64 m) bronze statue, Abraham Lincoln, created by Daniel Chester French, and the corresponding granite plinth and stele, designed by architect Henry Bacon.

On February 12, 1908, the Young Men's Republican Club organized the Abraham Lincoln Memorial Association to seek funds for the erection of an Abraham Lincoln statue on the Nebraska State Capitol grounds, and on July 8, 1908, the association invited Frank M. Hall to organize a committee to commission a sculptor. The committee (including Hall, State Auditor Silas Barton, Dr. H.B. Lowry, General Charles F. Manderson, Governor Ashton C. Shallenberger, Addison Waite, and Gurdon Wattles), awarded French the commission on June 24, 1909, and the committee unveiled the monument on September 2, 1912. Bacon and French later collaborated on the Lincoln Memorial (1914–22) in Washington, D.C.

The Lincoln Monument predates the current statehouse, and the Capitol Commission drew special attention to the monument during the final stage of competition to select an architect for a new capitol in 1920. In a note to the competing architects, the commission wrote, "Solutions should consider this monument and suggest for it a proper part in the ensemble, preferably but not imperatively on the building site proper." Construction of the new capitol commenced in 1922, and the Lincoln Monument remained intact.

== Interior ==
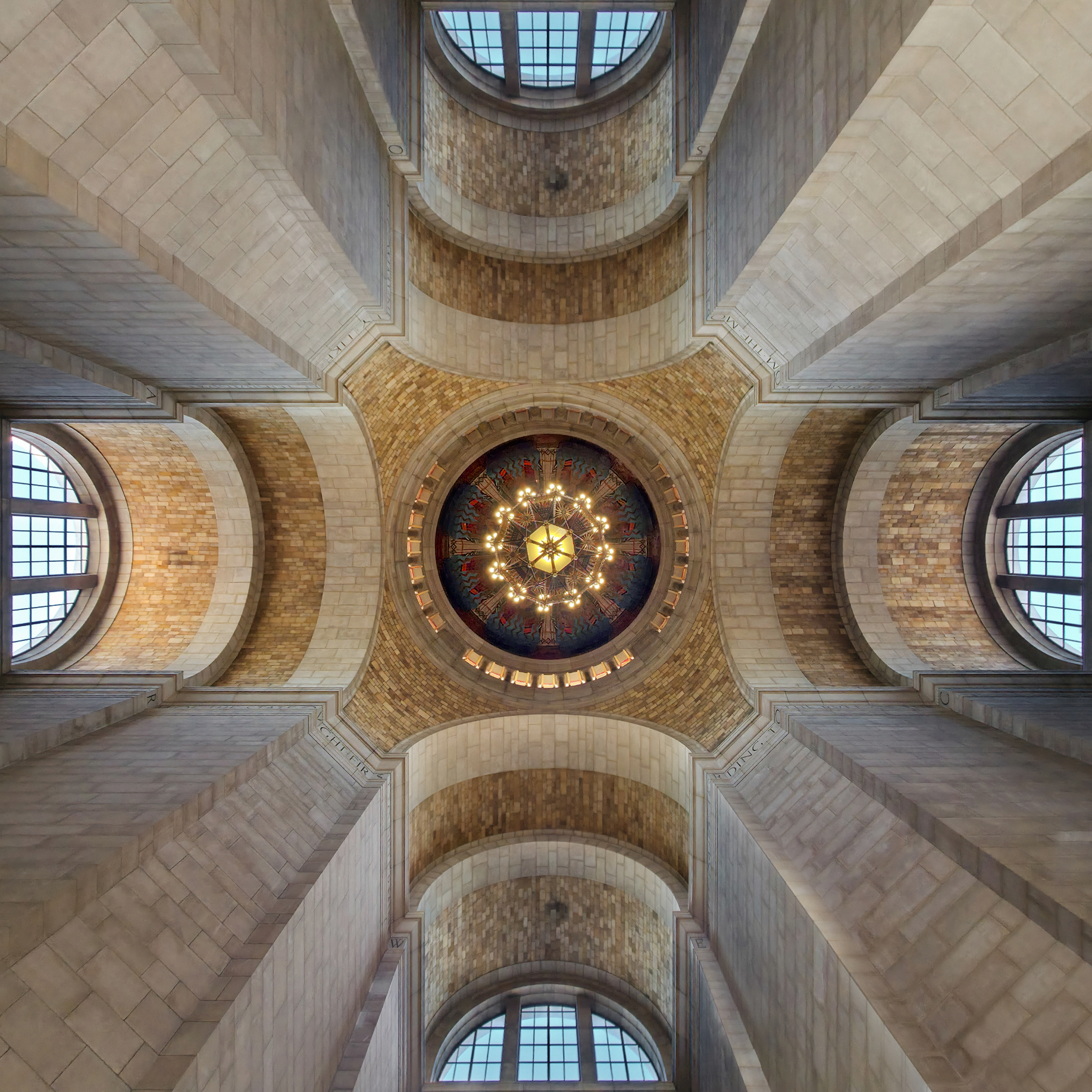
The Rotunda

The interior of the Nebraska State Capitol's monumental corridor is architecturally composed of three rooms: Vestibule, Great Hall, and Rotunda. Decorations that expand on Nebraska themes are read in a specific sequence beginning at the main north door. Monumental ornamentation is also found within the Governor's Suite, the Warner Legislative Chamber (former Senate), the George W. Norris Legislative Chamber (unicameral), and the Memorial Chamber (14th floor).

Meière designed the black-and-white marble mosaic panels of the Great Hall and Rotunda, representing the Procession of Life. Working with Alexander, Meière drew inspiration from Siena Cathedral after the two toured the cathedral in the summer of 1925. Meière also drew inspiration from Siena for her ceiling designs in the Vestibule, Great Hall, and Rotunda, representing Nature, Man, and Society. In addition to her thematic consultation with Alexander, Meière collaborated closely with the Rafael Guastavino Company of New York to create decorative timbrel vaulting. The vaults are composed of two types of ceramic tiles: glazed polychrome tile and unglazed acoustical terracotta tile called Rumford.

=== Vestibule ===
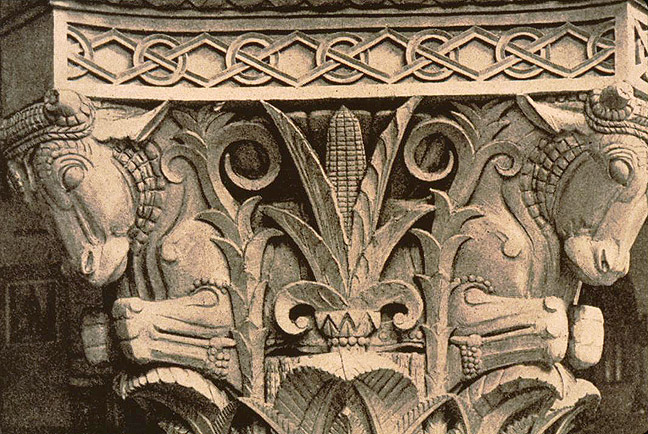
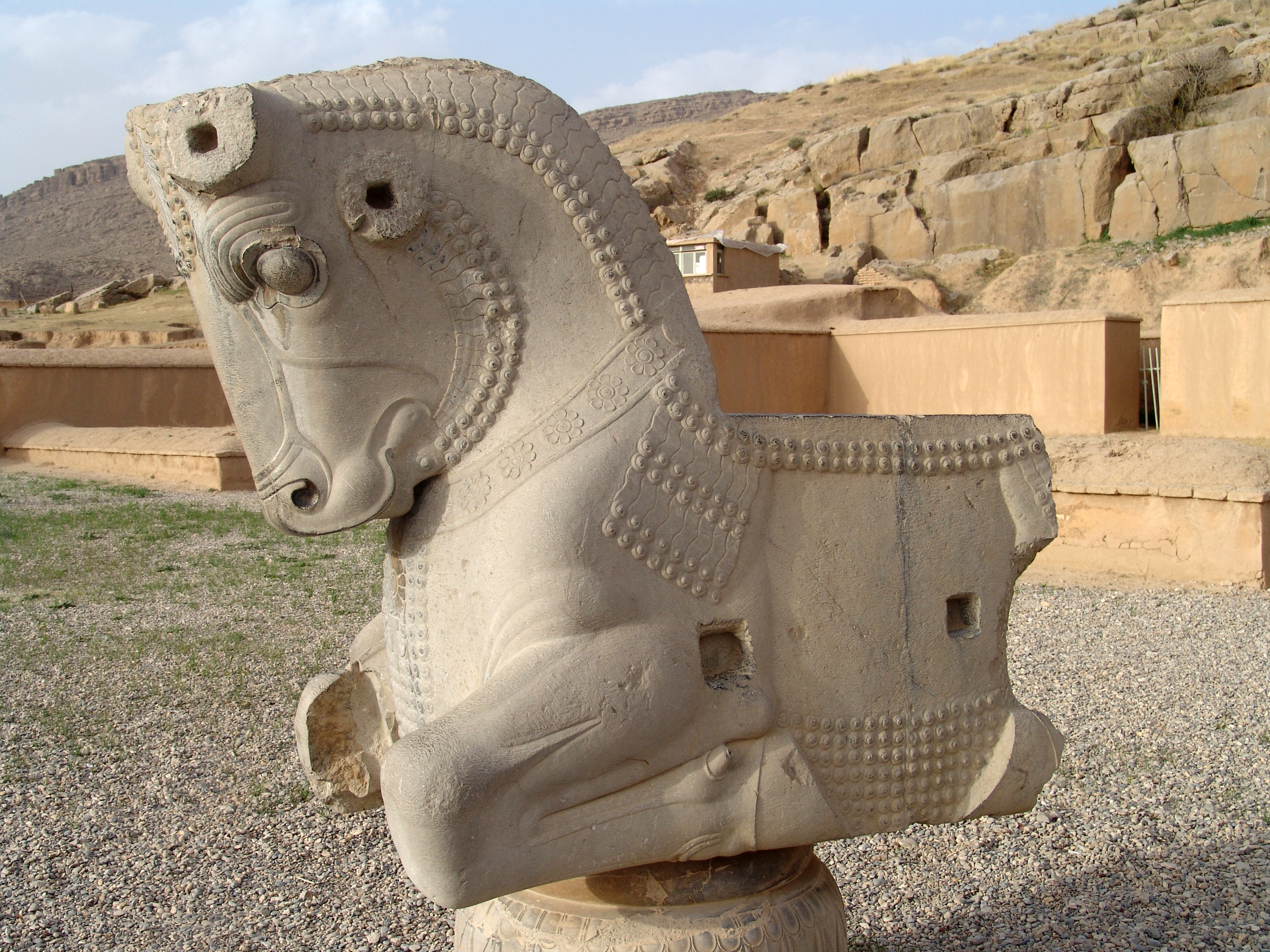
The bull details in the column capitals of the Vestibule (left) emulate the Persian bull capitals from ancient Persepolis.

The Vestibule introduces the capitol's interior ornamentation and represents Gifts of Nature. The sun is the room's central motif and is prominently featured as a medallion within the dome. The dome also incorporates mosaic images of agriculture, flora, and fauna. The vaulting is supported by the largest columns in the capitol—four 25-foot-tall (7.6 m) monoliths of Red Verona marble. The columns' capitals, designed by Lee Lawrie, are vaguely Corinthian and feature bull motifs inspired by the architecture of ancient Persepolis.

=== Great Hall ===
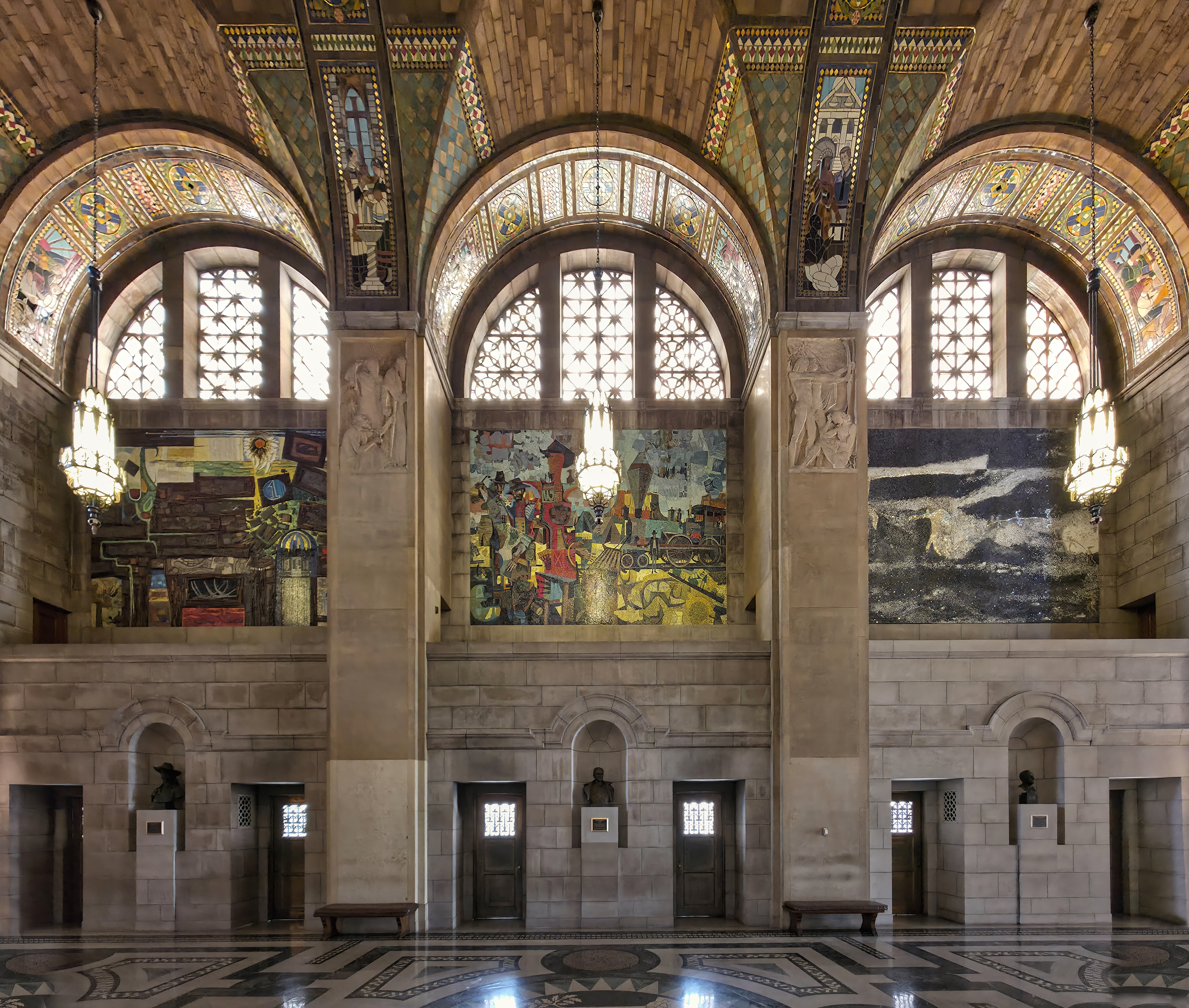
The Great Hall

The Great Hall follows the Vestibule and represents Life of Man. Three medallions—Traditions of the Past, Life of the Present, and Ideals of the Future—anchor the mosaic vaulting. Additionally, sixteen mosaic panels within the arches depict scenes of human activity, including an Architect, a Ball Player, and a Scientist.

The Procession of Life begins in the Great Hall's floor with the mosaic Genius of Creative Energy—an Apollo-like figure—surrounded by Cosmic Energy, lightning, moons, orbs, etc. Three tondi (circular) mosaics follow, depicting the Spirit of the Soil, the Spirit of Vegetation, and the Spirit of Animal Life.

The Great Hall also introduces the Nebraska Hall of Fame—a collection of bronze busts of noteworthy Nebraskans. The capitol's Thematic Consultant, Hartley Burr Alexander, is among the 26 current inductees.

=== Rotunda ===
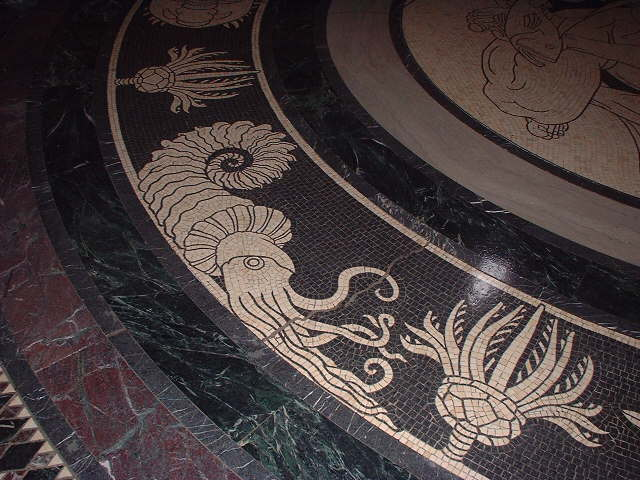
Hildreth Meiere. Ammonite and crinoid, floor detail. 1928. Rotunda.

The Rotunda follows the Great Hall and represents Virtues of the State. Eight winged virtues form a celestial rose within the mosaic dome: Temperance, Wisdom, Faith, Justice, Magnanimity, Charity, Hope, and Courage.

The Procession of Life continues in the Rotunda's floor with the mosaic panel Vital Energy, which shows the Genius of Life—an Eros-like figure with butterflies and pine cones. At the Rotunda's center, four tondi mosaics representing the Genius of Water, the Genius of Fire, the Genius of Air, and the Genius of Earth surround a larger tondo mosaic of Earth as the Life-giver. A mosaic band, or guilloche, interlaces the five tondi and depicts the fossil life of the Great Plains. Meière based the fossil mosaics on scientific illustrations drawn by University of Nebraska geologist Erwin Hinckley Barbour. The Procession of Life concludes at the Rotunda's south entrance with The Family.

=== Warner Legislative Chamber (east) ===
The Warner Legislative Chamber is located to the east of the Rotunda and was originally designed for the Nebraska House of Representatives. In 1927, the Capitol Commission concluded that the chamber was of inadequate size for the representative body, so the Goodhue Associates enlarged the original west, Senate chamber design (which was not yet constructed) and reassigned it for use by the House. Upon the capitol's completion in 1932, the Capitol Commission thus reassigned the east chamber to the Nebraska Senate. The chamber served the Senate during the 1933 and 1935 legislative sessions. With the 1937 inception of the unicameral legislature, the east chamber functioned as a committee hearing room and today serves as a public gathering space. On February 4, 1998, the Ninety-Fifth Nebraska Legislature named the chamber in honor of state senators Charles Warner and Jerome Warner with the passage of Legislative Resolution 322.

The chamber represents Plains Indians—Nebraska's first inhabitants. The chamber's mahogany doors, designed by Lee Lawrie, introduce the theme and depict a woman and a man standing on either side of a tree of life comprising cornstalks. Each door weighs 750 pounds (340 kg), and Lincoln artisan, Keats Lorenz, executed the carving.

Meière designed the mosaic dome to emulate beadwork, and the vaulting depicts four scenes of Indian life. Alexander also shared images of indigenous art with Meière for inspiration, including ledger art by Amos Bad Heart Bull. Meière used one particular drawing depicting a Sun Dance rite for the design of a tapestry above the speaker's niche.

=== George W. Norris Legislative Chamber (west) ===
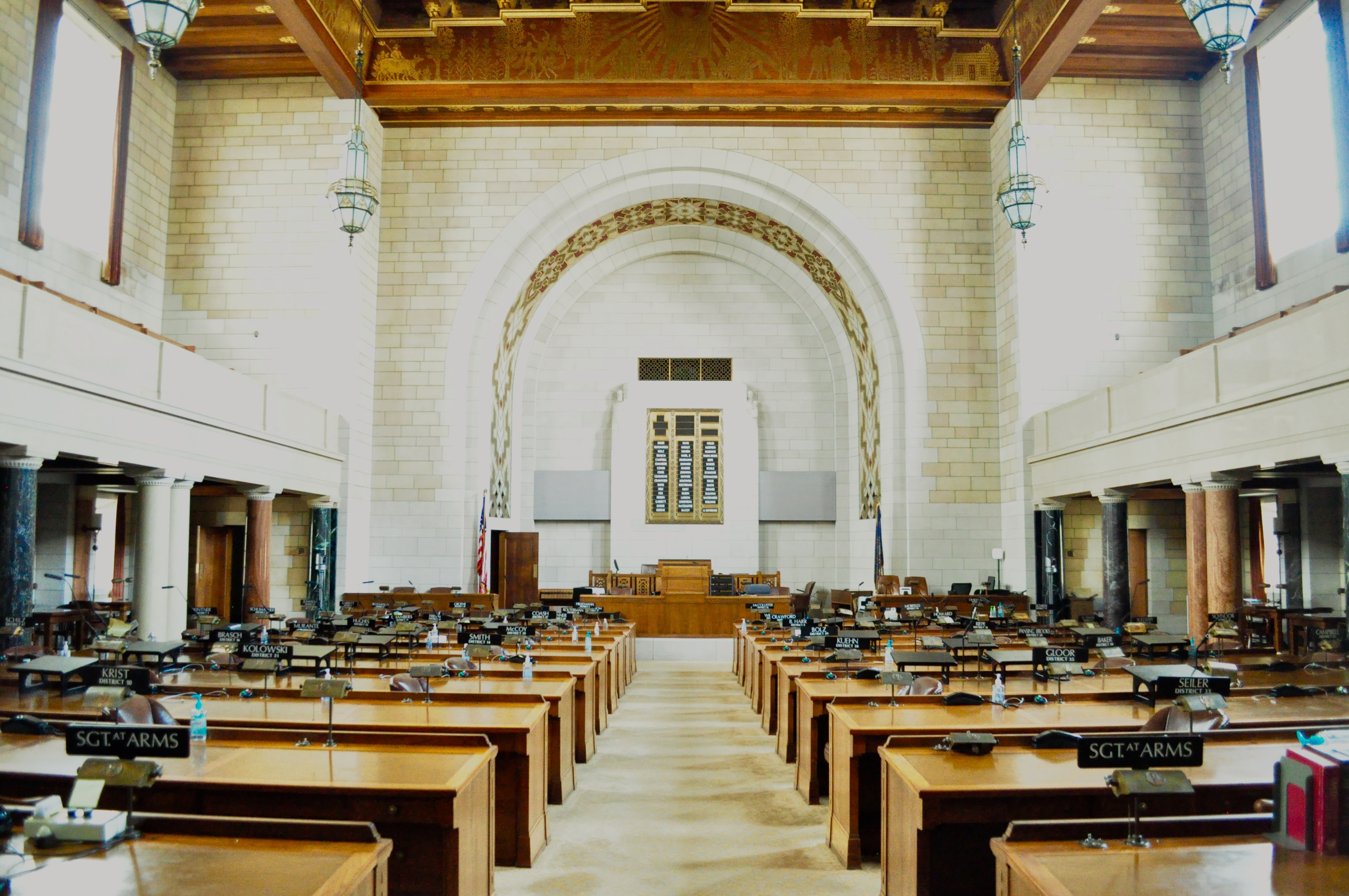
George W. Norris Legislative Chamber

The George W. Norris Legislative Chamber is located to the west of the Rotunda. Upon its completion in 1932, the chamber served the Nebraska House of Representatives during the 1933 and 1935 legislative sessions. In 1937, the chamber—being the larger of the two legislative halls—began to serve the unicameral legislature. On February 16, 1984, the Eighty-Eighth Nebraska Legislature named the chamber in honor of U.S. Senator George W. Norris with the passage of Legislative Resolution 257.

The chamber represents Euro-American expansion. The chamber's tooled-leather doors, designed by Meière, introduce the theme and depict a tree of life scene styled with Assyrian and Egyptian motifs.

Meière also designed the gold leaf patterns on the walnut-beamed ceiling. The dominant images depict the three Euro-American powers that have claimed the land that is today Nebraska: Spain (castle and lion), France (fleur-de-lis and honey bee), and the United States of America (shield and bald eagle).

=== Murals ===
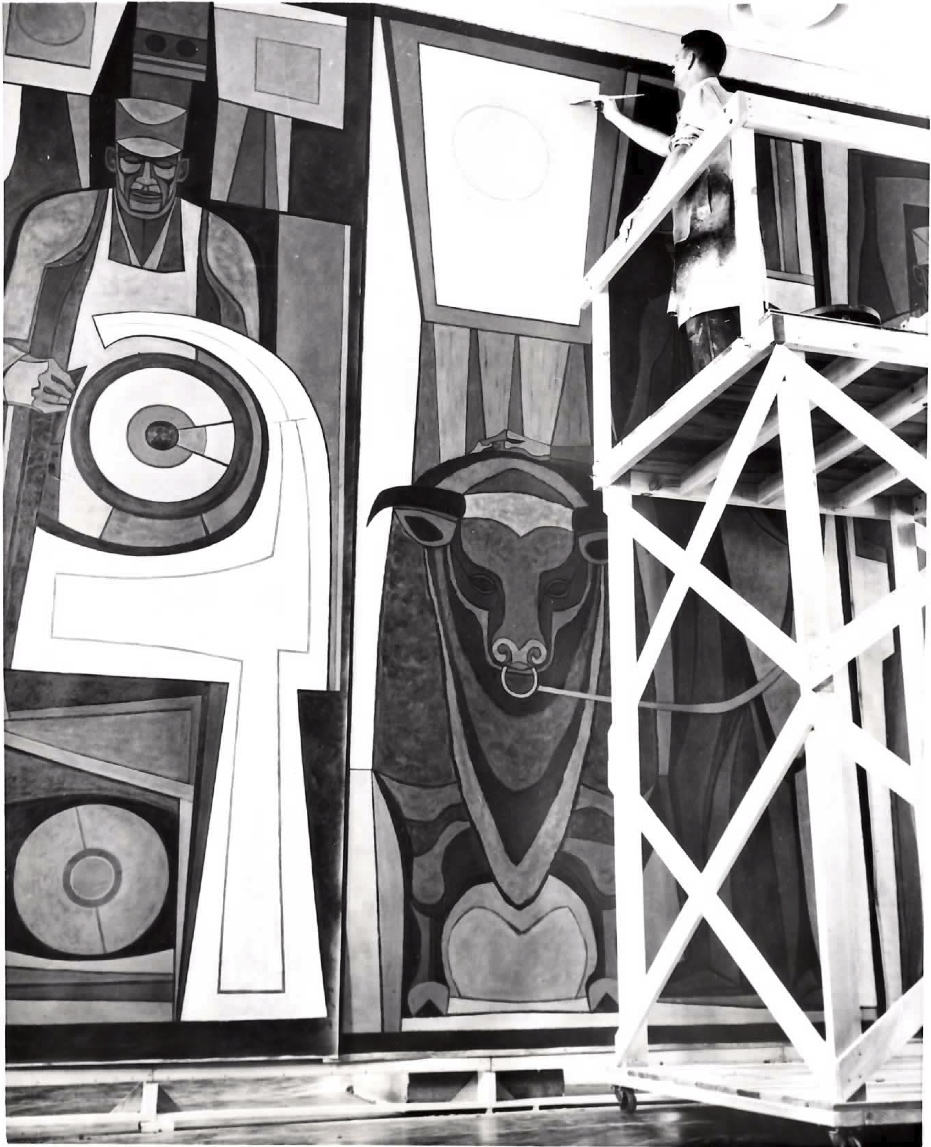
Kenneth Evett paints The Labors of the Hand for the Nebraska Capitol rotunda, 1954.

The mural program of the capitol is composed of twenty-one defined murals throughout the monumental hallways and Law Library, and a series of allegorical scenes within the Governor's Suite.

On September 22, 1925, the Capitol Commission accepted proposals by New York artist Augustus Vincent Tack to paint rooms within the Governor's Suite—proposals begun with Bertram Goodhue prior to his death in 1924. Tack completed and installed his series of allegorical figures in November 1927.

On February 21, 1930, the Capitol Commission hired Lincoln artist Elizabeth Honor Dolan to paint a mural on the north wall of the Law Library. Dolan completed The Spirit of the Prairie in August 1930. It is the only mural in the capitol painted in situ.

In addition to the Governor's Suite and the Law Library, Goodhue designed 20 recessed mural spaces in the capitol's monumental hallways. In May 1933, under ever-worsening economic conditions, the Nebraska Legislature re-appropriated the Capitol Commission's unexpended budget. With depleted funds, the commission resolved to terminate its own existence, leaving the mural project incomplete.

In 1951, the Nebraska Legislature created the Capitol Mural Commission and empowered it to complete the mural program. Over the next 50 years, the Capitol Mural Commission held a series of competitions to select artists for the remaining murals. The commission also used details from Dr. Hartley Burr Alexander's original thematic plan to guide the mural's subject matter.

Capitol Murals
Artist	Title	Mural	Date	Material	Dimensions	Location
Augustus Vincent Tack	Governor's Suite Series		1927	Oil on linen		Governor's Suite
Elizabeth Dolan	The Spirit of the Prairie		1930	Oil on linen		Law Library
Kenneth Evett	The Labors of the Hand		1954	Oil on linen	15 ft × 24 ft (4.6 m × 7.3 m)	Rotunda
Kenneth Evett	The Labors of the Head		1956	Oil on linen	15 ft × 24 ft (4.6 m × 7.3 m)	Rotunda
Kenneth Evett	The Labors of the Heart		1956	Oil on linen	15 ft × 24 ft (4.6 m × 7.3 m)	Rotunda
James Penney	The Homesteader's Campfire		1963	Oil on linen	8.5 ft × 19 ft (2.6 m × 5.8 m)	Vestibule
James Penney	The First Furrow		1963	Oil on linen	8.5 ft × 19 ft (2.6 m × 5.8 m)	Vestibule
James Penney	The House Raising		1963	Oil on linen	8.5 ft × 19 ft (2.6 m × 5.8 m)	Vestibule
Jeanne Reynal	The Blizzard of 1888		1965	Glass mosaic	13 ft × 19 ft (4.0 m × 5.8 m)	Great Hall
F. John Miller	The Coming of the Railroad		1966	Glass mosaic	13 ft × 19 ft (4.0 m × 5.8 m)	Great Hall
Reinhold Marxhausen	The Spirit of Nebraska		1966	Glass mosaic	13 ft × 19 ft (4.0 m × 5.8 m)	Great Hall
Jeanne Reynal	The Tree Planting		1966	Glass mosaic	13 ft × 19 ft (4.0 m × 5.8 m)	Great Hall
Reinhold Marxhausen	The Building of the Capitol		1966	Glass mosaic	13 ft × 19 ft (4.0 m × 5.8 m)	Great Hall
Charles Clement	The U.S. Survey		1966	Glass mosaic	13 ft × 19 ft (4.0 m × 5.8 m)	Great Hall
Stephen Roberts	The Ideal of International Law		1996	Oil on linen	6.75 ft × 12 ft (2.06 m × 3.66 m)	Memorial Chamber
Stephen Roberts	The Perils of Fire		1996	Oil on linen	6.75 ft × 12 ft (2.06 m × 3.66 m)	Memorial Chamber
Stephen Roberts	The Ideal of Freedom		1996	Oil on linen	6.75 ft × 12 ft (2.06 m × 3.66 m)	Memorial Chamber
Stephen Roberts	The Scourge of Poverty		1996	Oil on linen	6.75 ft × 12 ft (2.06 m × 3.66 m)	Memorial Chamber
Stephen Roberts	The Ideal of Universal Peace		1996	Oil on linen	6.75 ft × 12 ft (2.06 m × 3.66 m)	Memorial Chamber
Stephen Roberts	The Scourge of Plague		1996	Oil on linen	6.75 ft × 12 ft (2.06 m × 3.66 m)	Memorial Chamber
Stephen Roberts	The Ideal of Self-Determination		1996	Oil on linen	6.75 ft × 12 ft (2.06 m × 3.66 m)	Memorial Chamber
Stephen Roberts	The Scourge of Famine		1996	Oil on linen	6.75 ft × 12 ft (2.06 m × 3.66 m)	Memorial Chamber

== Gallery ==
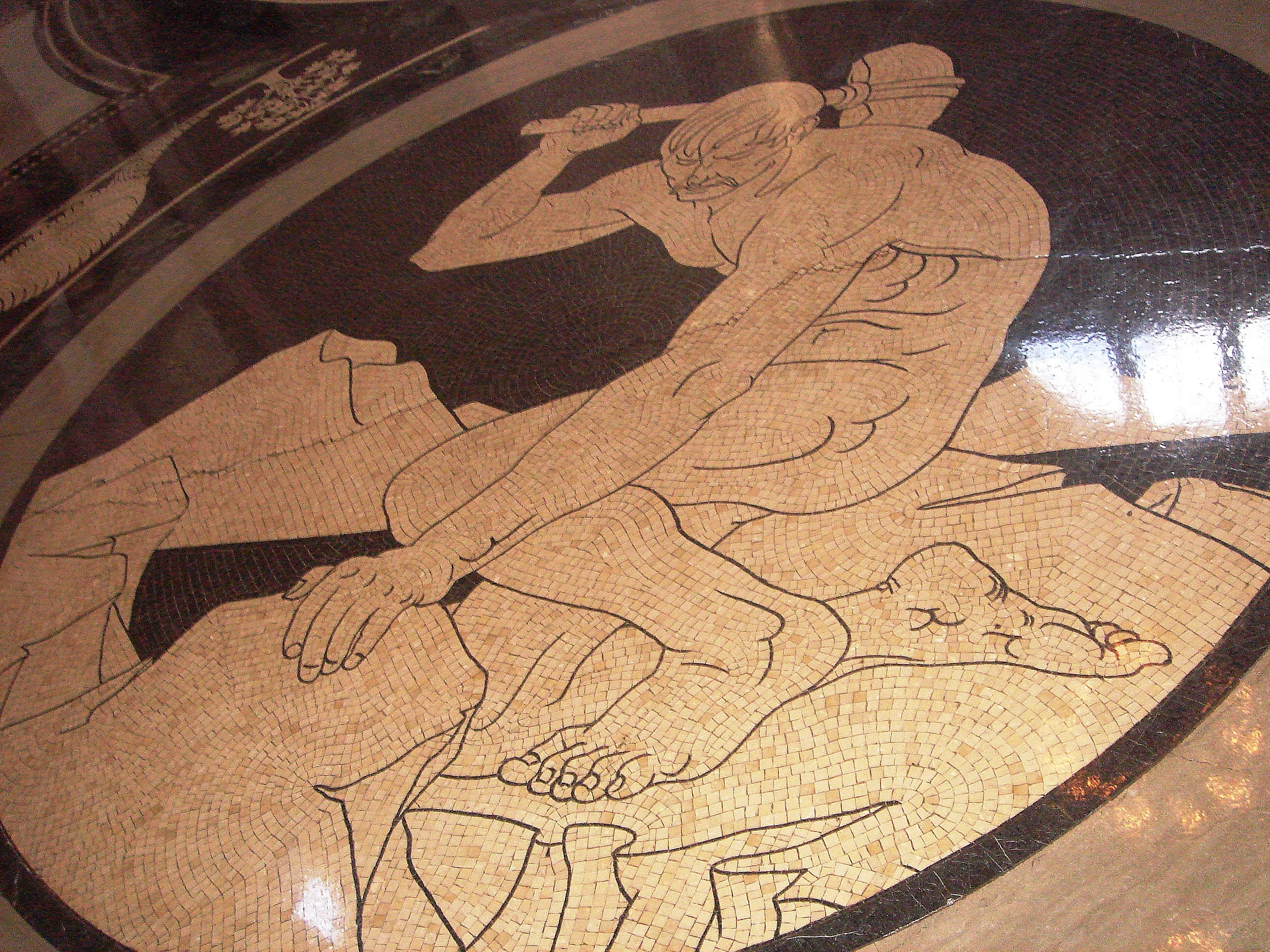
Hildreth Meière. Genius of Earth, floor detail. 1928. Rotunda.

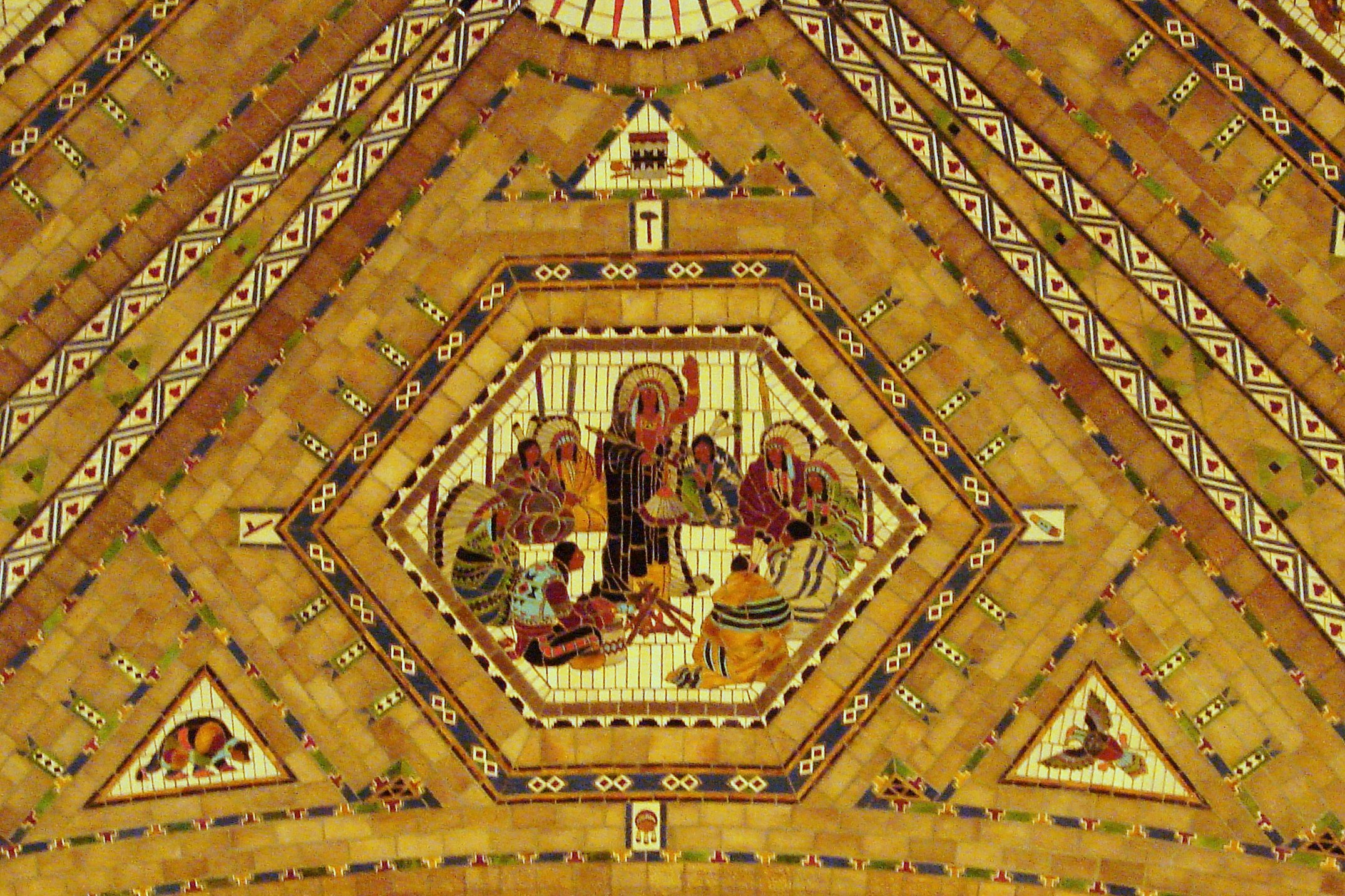
Hildreth Meière. The Council Fire, ceiling detail. 1927. Warner Legislative Chamber (east).

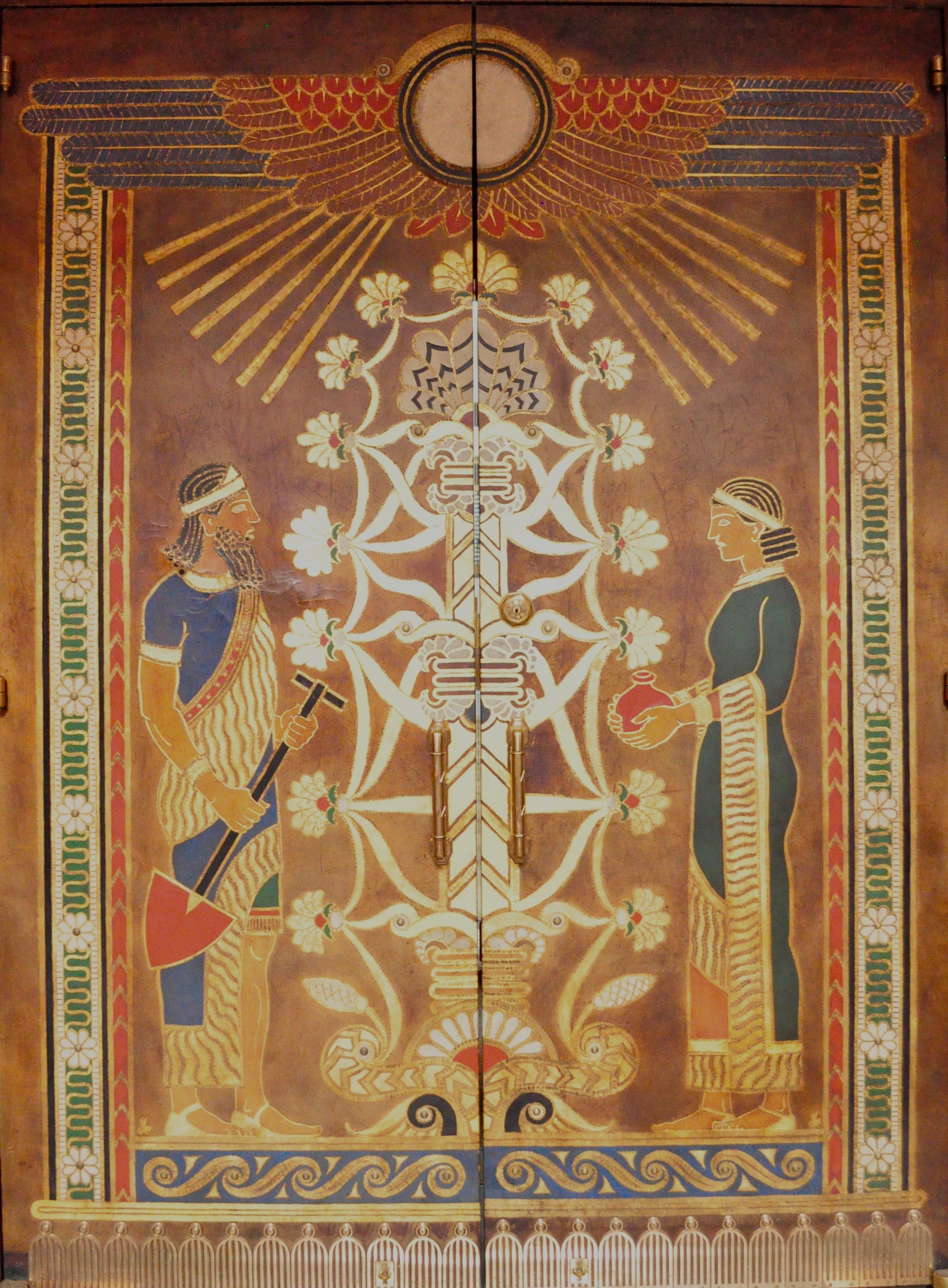
Hildreth Meière. Doors. 1932. George W. Norris Legislative Chamber (west).

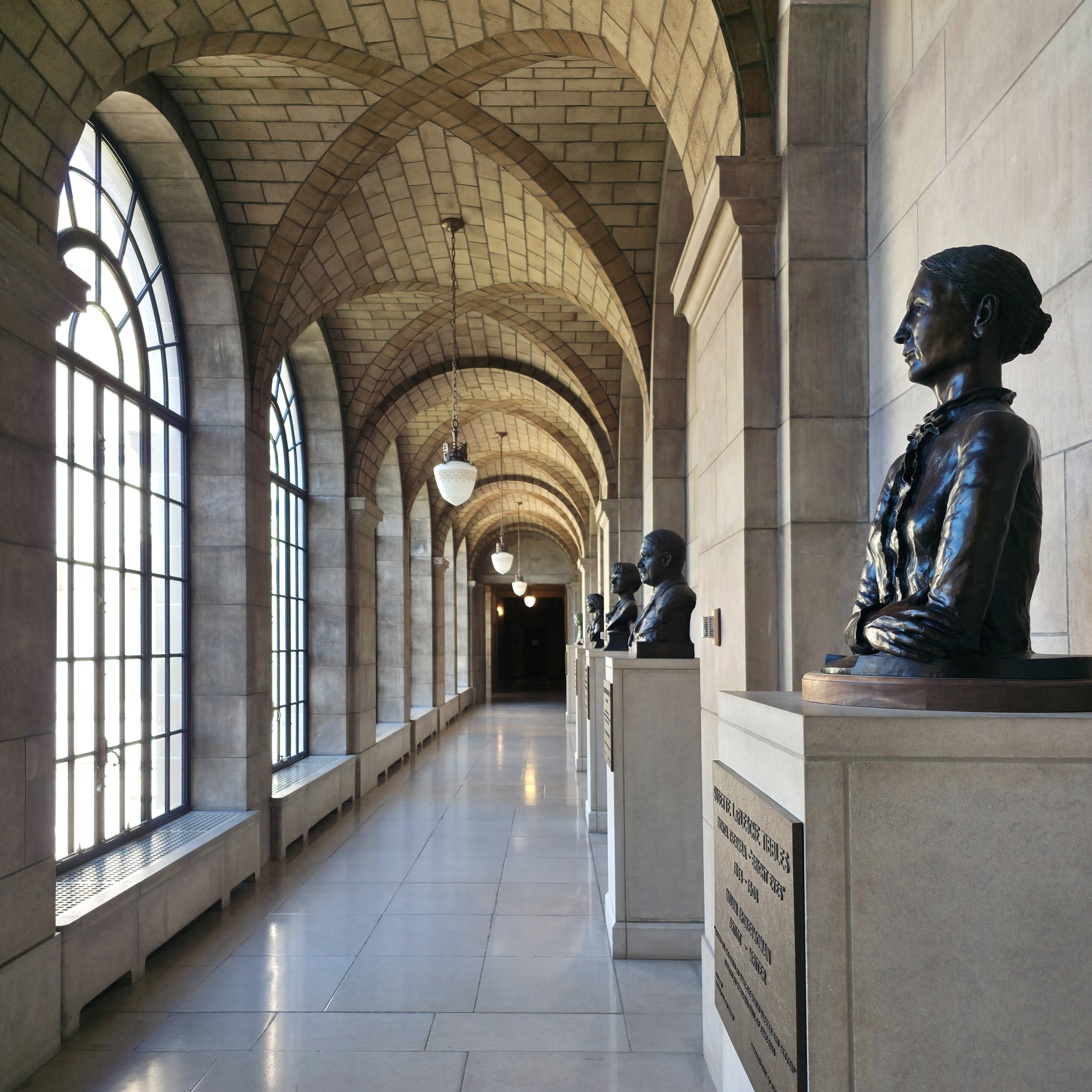
Memorial to Bess Streeter Aldridge

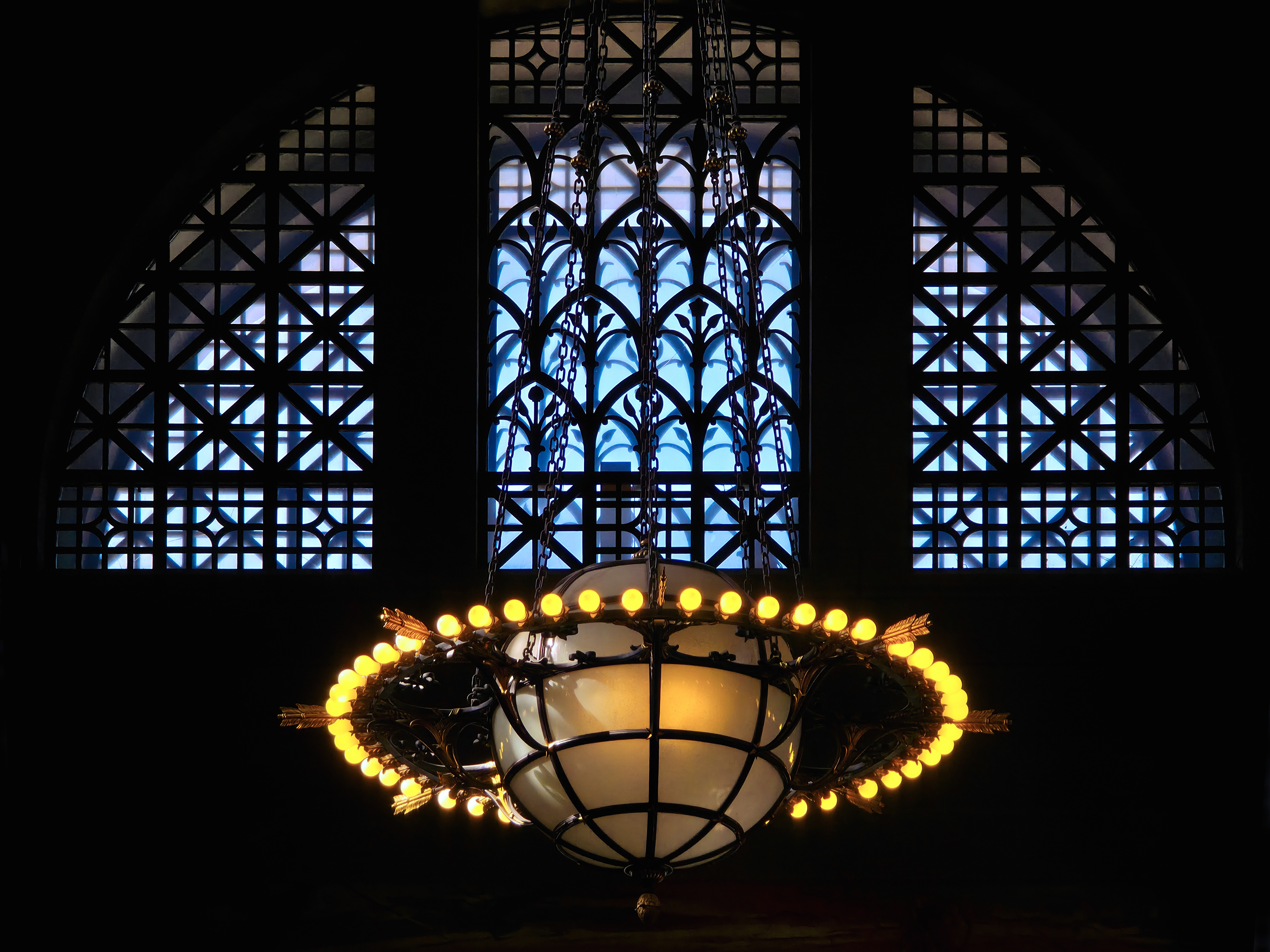
Saturn Chandelier

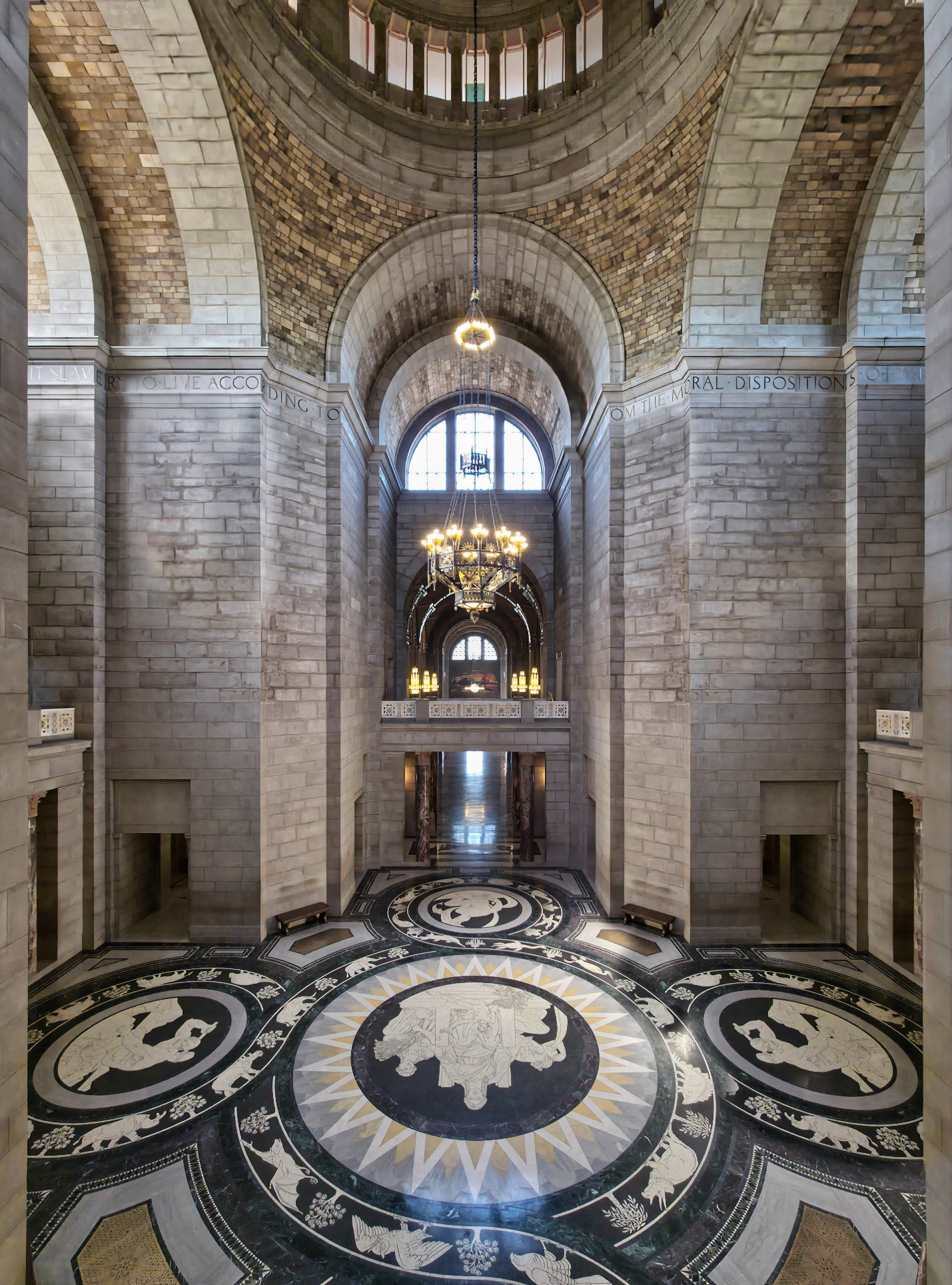
The Rotunda

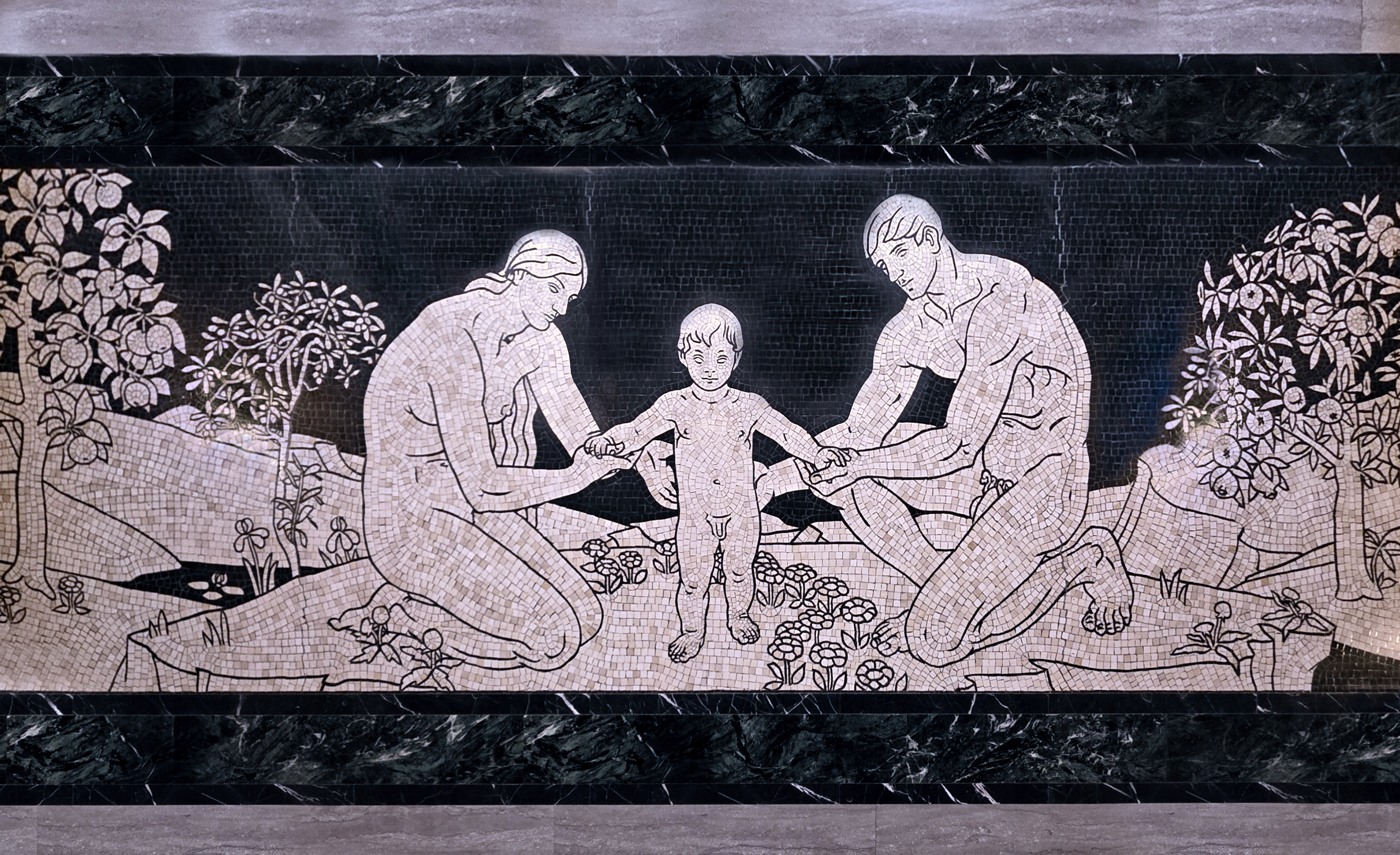
Hildreth Meière. floor detail. 1928. Rotunda.

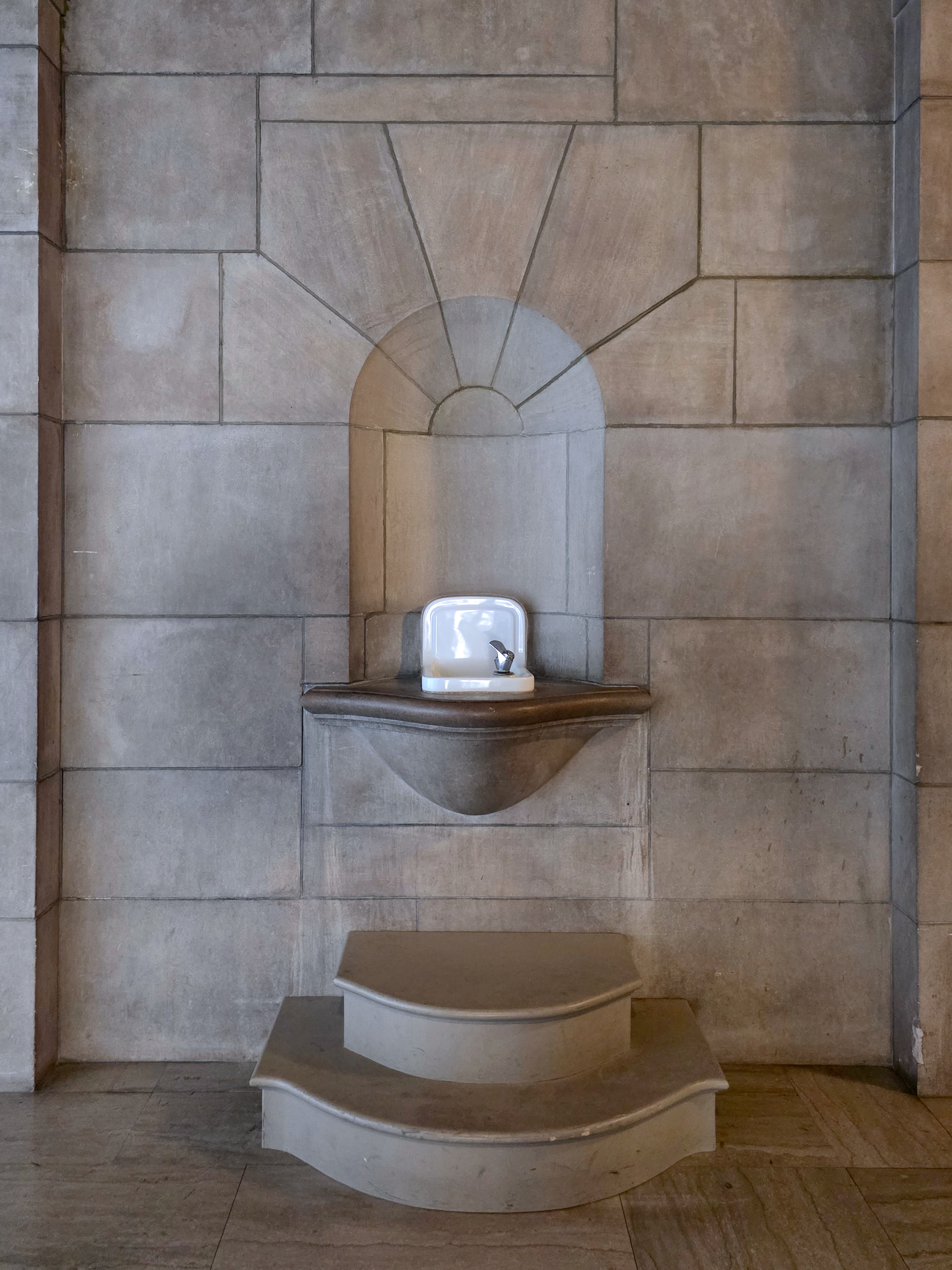
Drinking Fountain

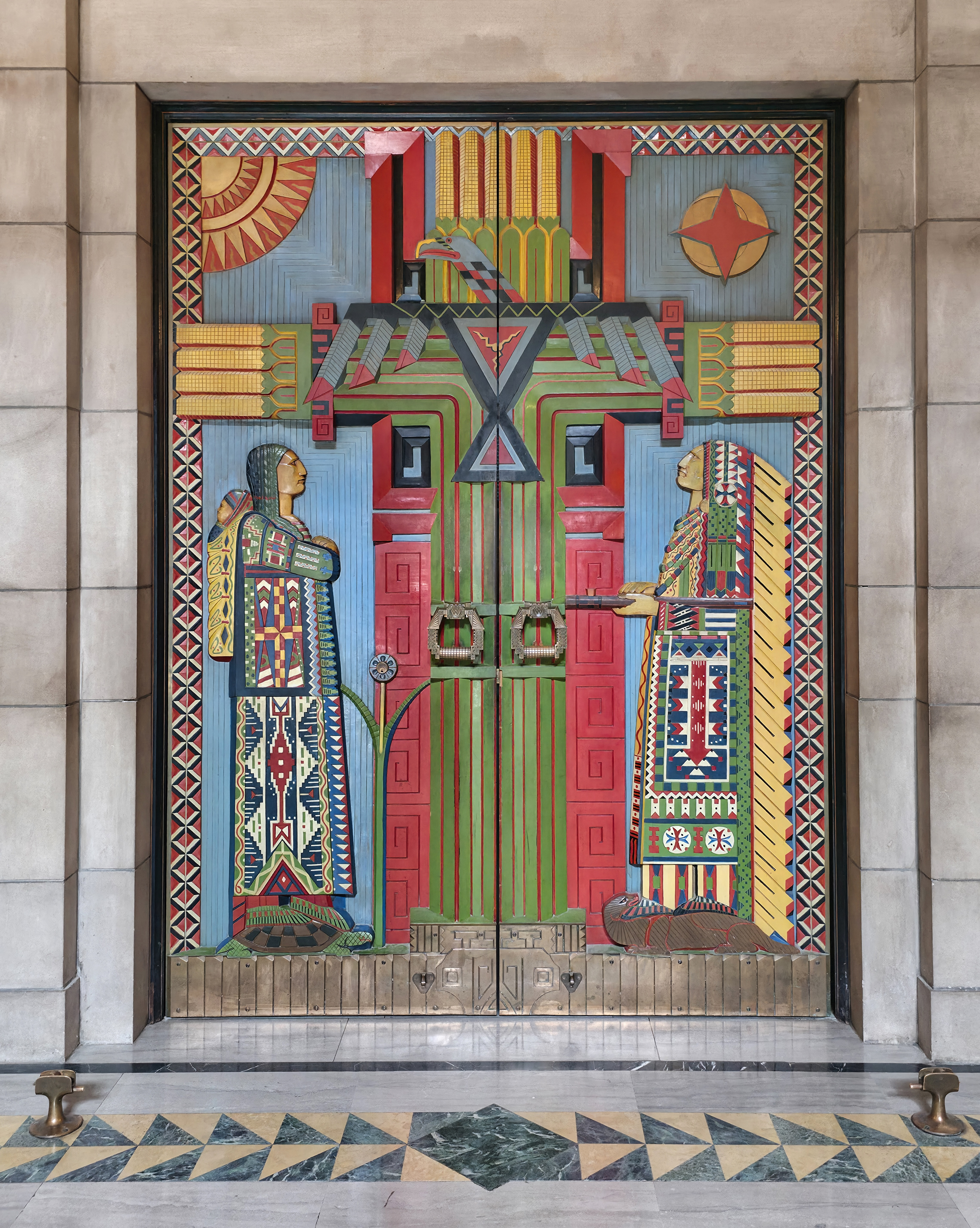
Lee Lawrie. Doors. 1929. Warner Legislative Chamber (east).

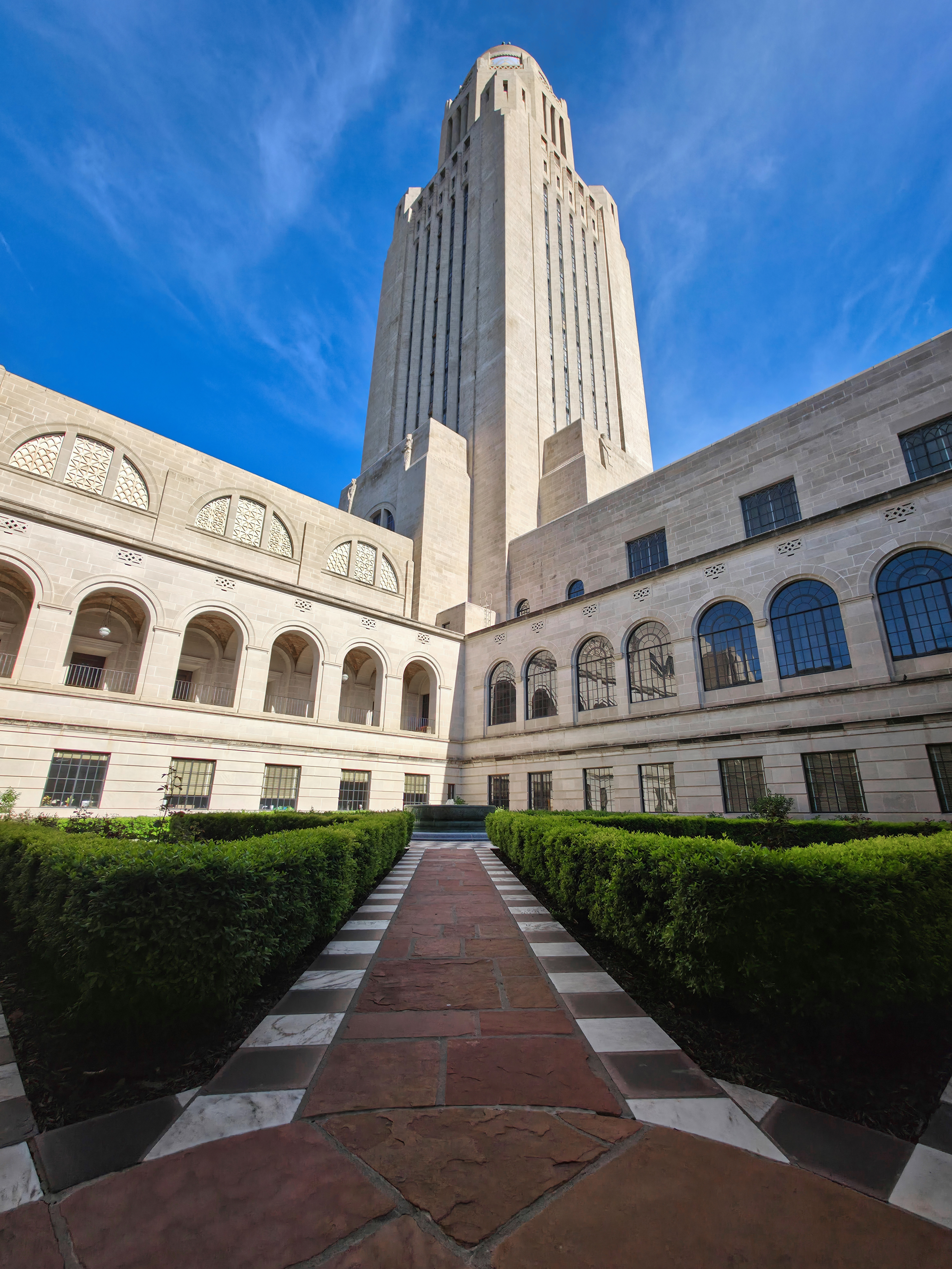
The Courtyard

== See also ==
- List of Nebraska state legislatures
- List of state and territorial capitols in the United States

== Sources ==
- Brawer, Catherine Coleman (2010). Walls Speak: The Narrative Art of Hildreth Meière. St. Bonaventure, NY: St. Bonaventure University. pp. 20–39.
- Busk, Michael Reid (2011). "The brawl and the tango". Michigan Quarterly Review. 50 (1): 3–0_6. ISSN 0026-2420. ProQuest 859436838.
- Cavett, Dick (October 20, 2015). Brief Encounters: Conversations, Magic Moments, and Assorted Hijinks. Henry Holt and Company. p. 89. ISBN 978-1250070753.
- Coffey, Margery (September 3, 1990). "'Safe art' policies challenged". Lincoln Journal Star.
- Copple, Neale (1959). Tower on the Plains: Lincoln's Centennial History, 1859-1959. Lincoln, NE: Lincoln Centennial Commission Publishers.
- Daum, Meghan (November 2011). "Lincoln, Nebraska: Home on the Prairie". Smithsonian Magazine. Washington, D.C.: Smithsonian Institution.
- Hersey, George L. (May 1999). The Monumental Impulse: Architecture's Biological Roots. The MIT Press. p. 129. ISBN 978-0262582032.
- Hoak, Edward Warren; Church, Willis Humphry (2002). Masterpieces of American Architecture: Museums, Libraries, Churches and Other Public Buildings. Mineola, NY: Dover Publications, Inc. pp. 115–125. ISBN 0486422313.
- Luebke, Frederick C., ed. (1990). A Harmony of the Arts: The Nebraska State Capitol. Lincoln, NE: University of Nebraska Press.
- McCready, Eric Scott (Fall 1974). "The Nebraska State Capitol: Its Design, Background and Influence" (PDF). Nebraska History. 55 (3): 325–461. Archived from the original (PDF) on August 3, 2021.
- Nebraska Capitol Commission (1919–1935). Nebraska Capitol Commission Minutes. Nebraska Office of the Capitol Commission: Nebraska Capitol Collections.
- Watkins, Albert (1913). History of Nebraska: From the Earliest Exploration of the Trans-Mississippi Region. Vol. III (First ed.). Lincoln, NE: Western Publishing and Engraving Company.
- Whitaker, Charles Harris and Hartley Burr Alexander. The Architectural Sculpture of the State Capitol at Lincoln, Nebraska, Bertram Grosvenor Goodhue: architect, Lee Lawrie: sculptor, architects after Mr. Goodhue's death in 1924: Bertram Grosvenor Goodhue associates. New York: Press of the American Institute of Architects, 1926. 16 pp.; 45 illustrations.
- Yoder, Rick; Harding, David (2010). Nebraska Curiosities: Quirky Characters, Roadside Oddities & Other Offbeat Stuff. Lanham, Maryland: Rowman & Littlefield. p. 62. ISBN 9780762746835.
- Zabel, Orville H. (Fall 1981). "History in Stone: The Story in Sculpture on the Exterior of the Nebraska Capitol". Nebraska History. 62 (3): 285–372.
