= List of defunct gentlemen's clubs in the United States =

The following is a list of notable traditional gentlemen's clubs that once existed in the United States but have since closed. For currently operating clubs see List of gentlemen's clubs in the United States.

== Closed clubs ==
=== Alabama ===
- Mobile
  - The Manassas Club (1861–1920s)

=== District of Columbia ===
- Washington
  - The City Tavern Club (1962–2024)
  - The 1925 F Street Club (1935–1999)
  - The Washington Club (1891–2013), merged into the University Club of Washington, D.C.

=== Georgia ===
- Atlanta
  - The Standard Club (1866–1983), moved to Johns Creek, Georgia, and became a country club

=== Illinois ===
- Chicago
  - The Chicago Athletic Association (1890–2007)

=== Massachusetts ===
- Boston
  - The Anthology Club (1804–1811), which founded the Boston Athenæum
  - The Boston Athletic Association (1887–1936), lost clubhouse amidst the Great Depression, continues to exist as a society organizing races, including the Boston Marathon
  - The Boston City Club (1906–1949)
  - The Massachusetts Charitable Mechanic Association (1795–1959), lost clubhouse and moved to Quincy, Massachusetts, where it became a charity fund
- Lowell
  - The Yorick Club (1882–1979)
- Fall River
  - The Quequechan Club (1895–2012)

=== Michigan ===
- Detroit
  - The Harmonie Club (1849–1974)

=== Missouri ===
- Kansas City
  - The Kansas City Athletic Club (1887–1997), moved to Kansas City, Kansas
  - The Kansas City Club (1882–2015), moved and merged into the University Club at the latter's premises; the merged club adopted the Kansas City Club name in 2001

=== Nebraska ===
- Lincoln
  - The Nebraska Club (1954–2020)

=== New Jersey ===
- Newark
  - The Essex Club (1876–1992)

=== New York ===
- Albany
  - The University Club of Albany (1901–2022)
- New York City
  - The Downtown Athletic Club (1926–2002), founded the Heisman Trophy and awarded it each year until closure
  - The Engineers' Club (1888–1979)
  - The Friars' Club (1904–2024)
  - The India House Club (1914–2020)
  - The Princeton Club of New York (1866–2021)
  - The Soldiers', Sailors', Marines', Coast Guard and Airmen's Club (1919–2018)
  - The Whitehall Club (1908–1992)
- Poughkeespie
  - The Amrita Club (1873–1980)
- Rochester
  - The University Club of Rochester (1909–1999)

=== Ohio ===
- Cincinnati
  - The Cincinnati Club (1889–1983)
  - The Cuvier Press Club (1911–1973)
  - The Phoenix Club (1859–1911), merged into the Business Men's Club
- Cleveland
  - The Cleveland Athletic Club (1908–2007), insolvent

=== Pennsylvania ===
- Philadelphia
  - The Poor Richard Club (1925–1980)
  - The Princeton Club (1868–1979)
  - The Rittenhouse Club (1883–1991), lost clubhouse, continues to exist as an "inner club" of the Acorn Club, a women's club
  - The Vesper Club (1901–2012), lost clubhouse but briefly continued to exist as an "inner club" of the Racquet Club of Philadelphia, but then was evicted from Racquet Club when refused to obey a new, clubwide smoking ban
- Pittsburgh
  - The Concordia Club (1874–2009), insolvent

=== Washington ===
- Seattle
  - The Arctic Club (1908–1971)

=== Wisconsin ===
- Wausau
  - The Wausau Club (1901–2004)

== Gallery ==
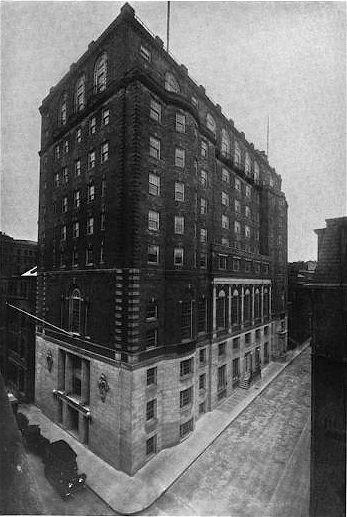
The Boston City Club

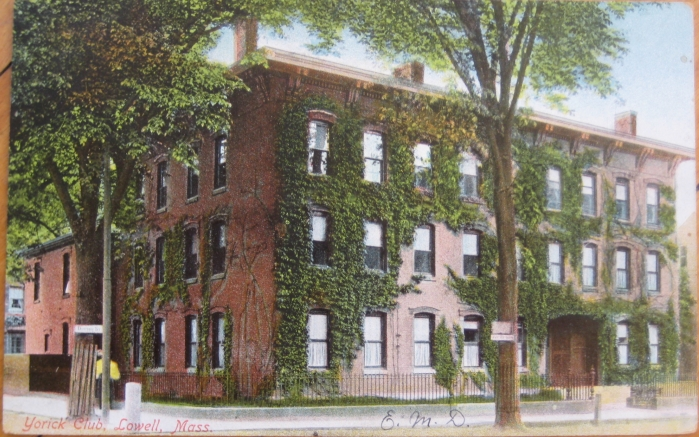
The Yorick Club (1901–1979), Lowell, Massachusetts

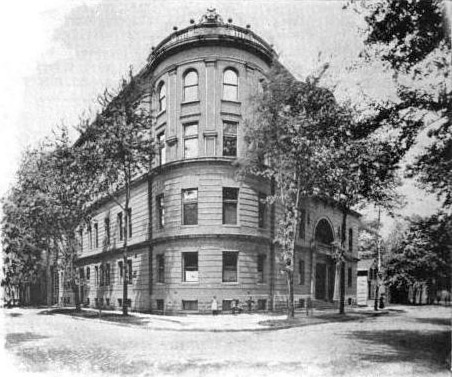
The Harmonie Club (1893–1974), Detroit, Michigan

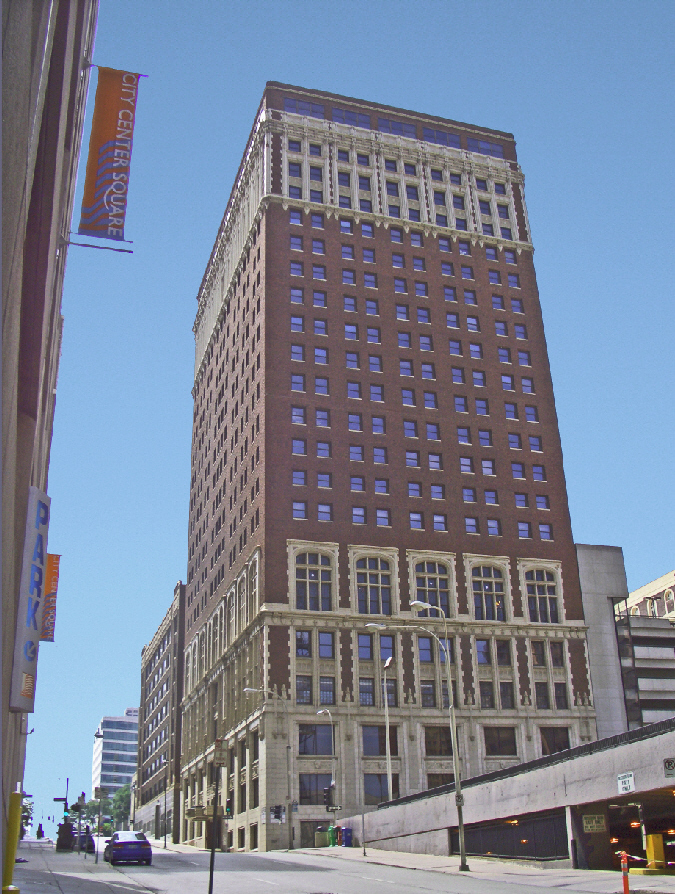
The Kansas City Athletic Club (1923–1997), Kansas City, Missouri

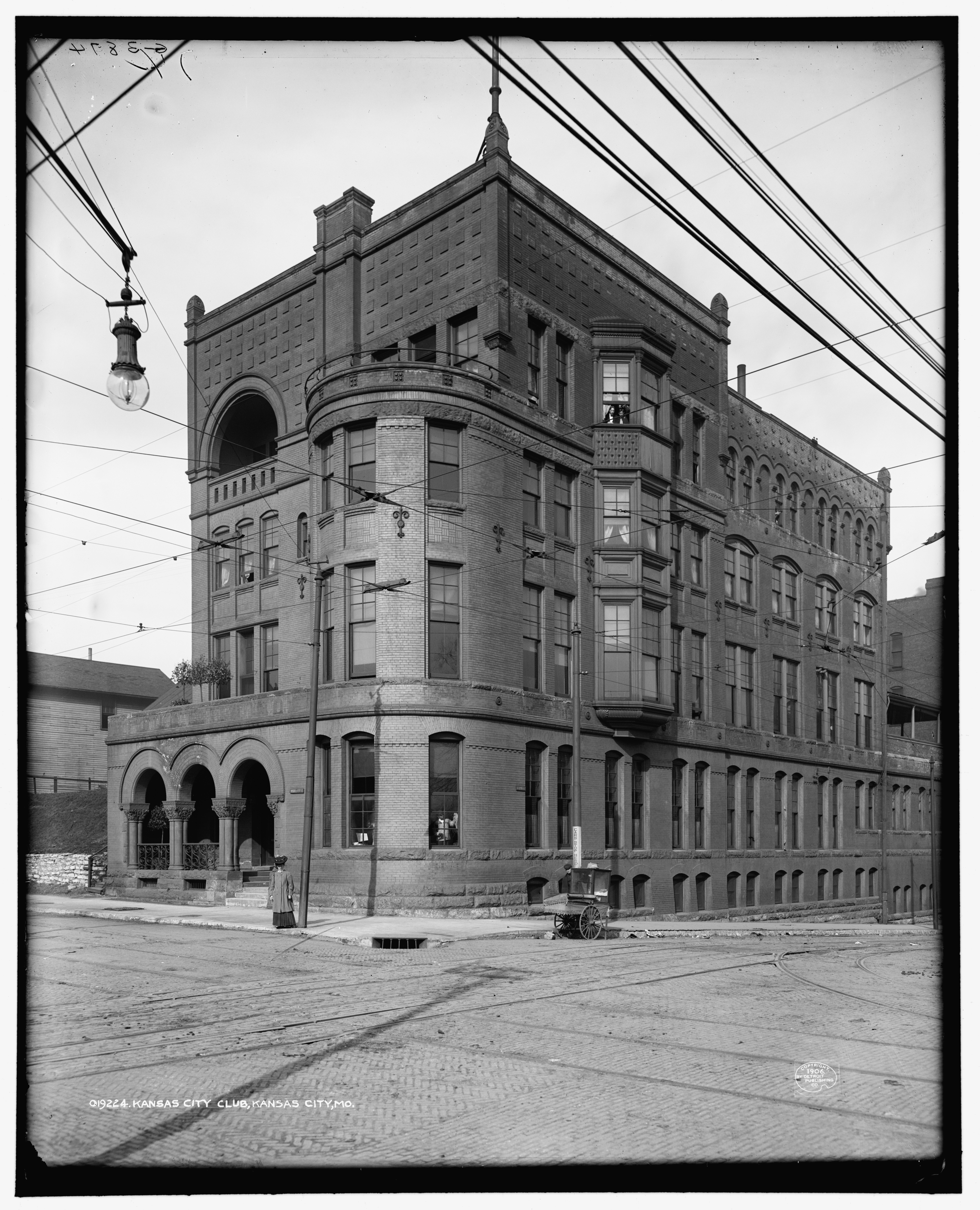
The Kansas City Club (1888–1922), Kansas City, Missouri

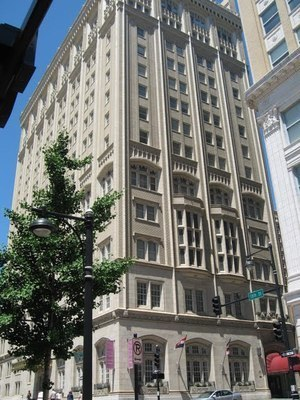
The Kansas City Club (1922–2001)

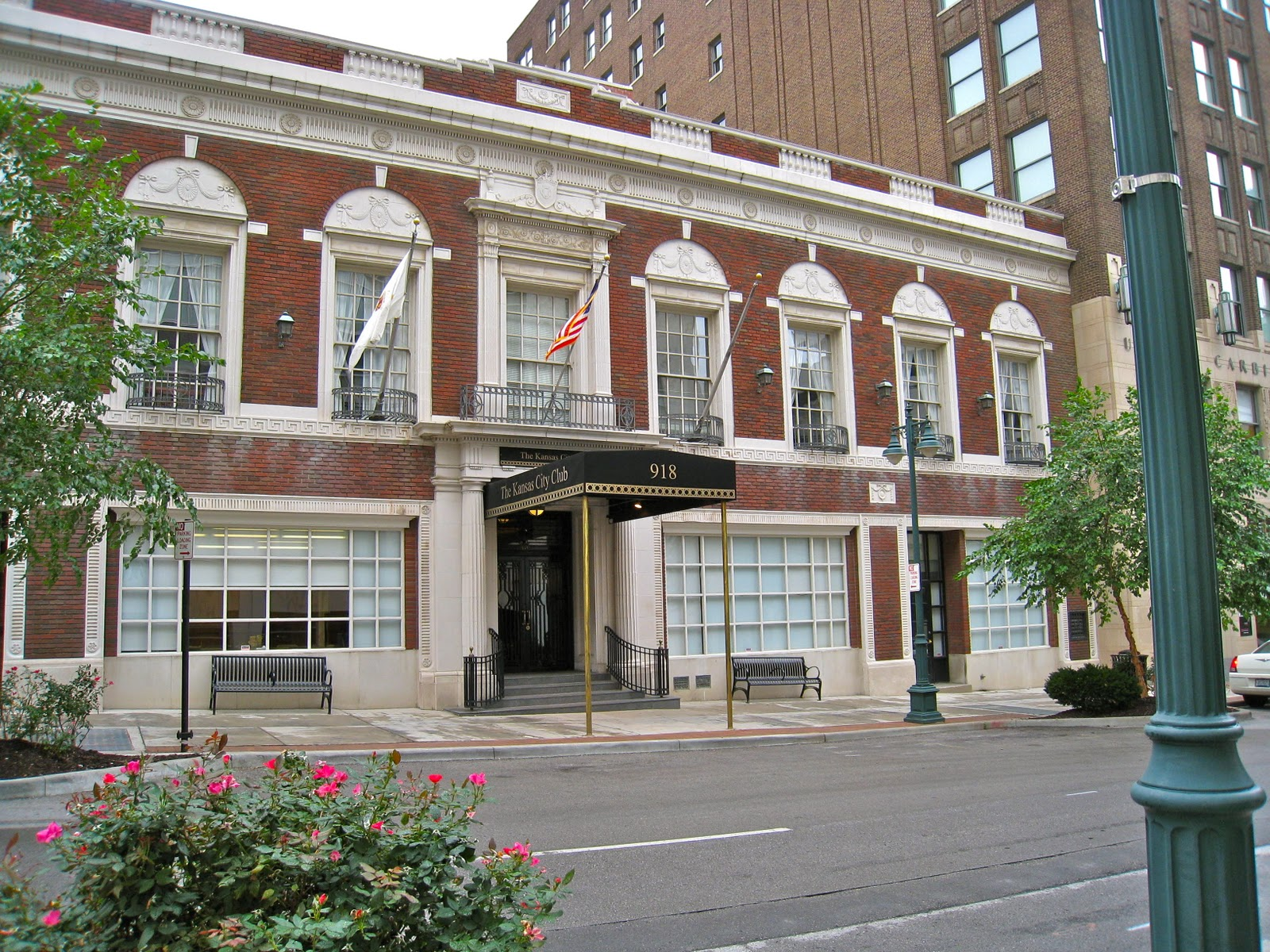
The University Club of Kansas City (1920–2001); the Kansas City Club (2001–2015)

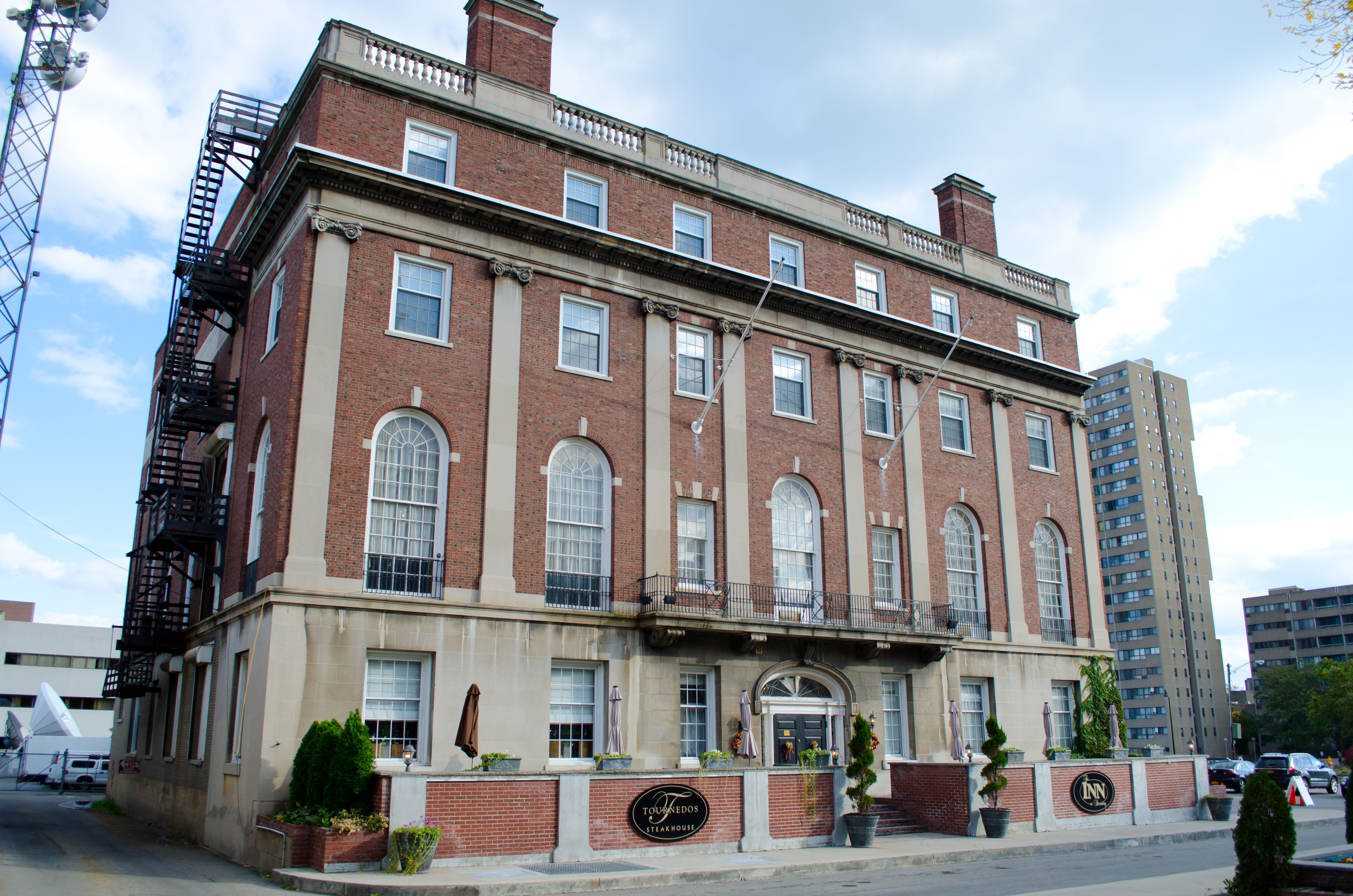
The University Club of Rochester (1929–1999), Rochester, New York

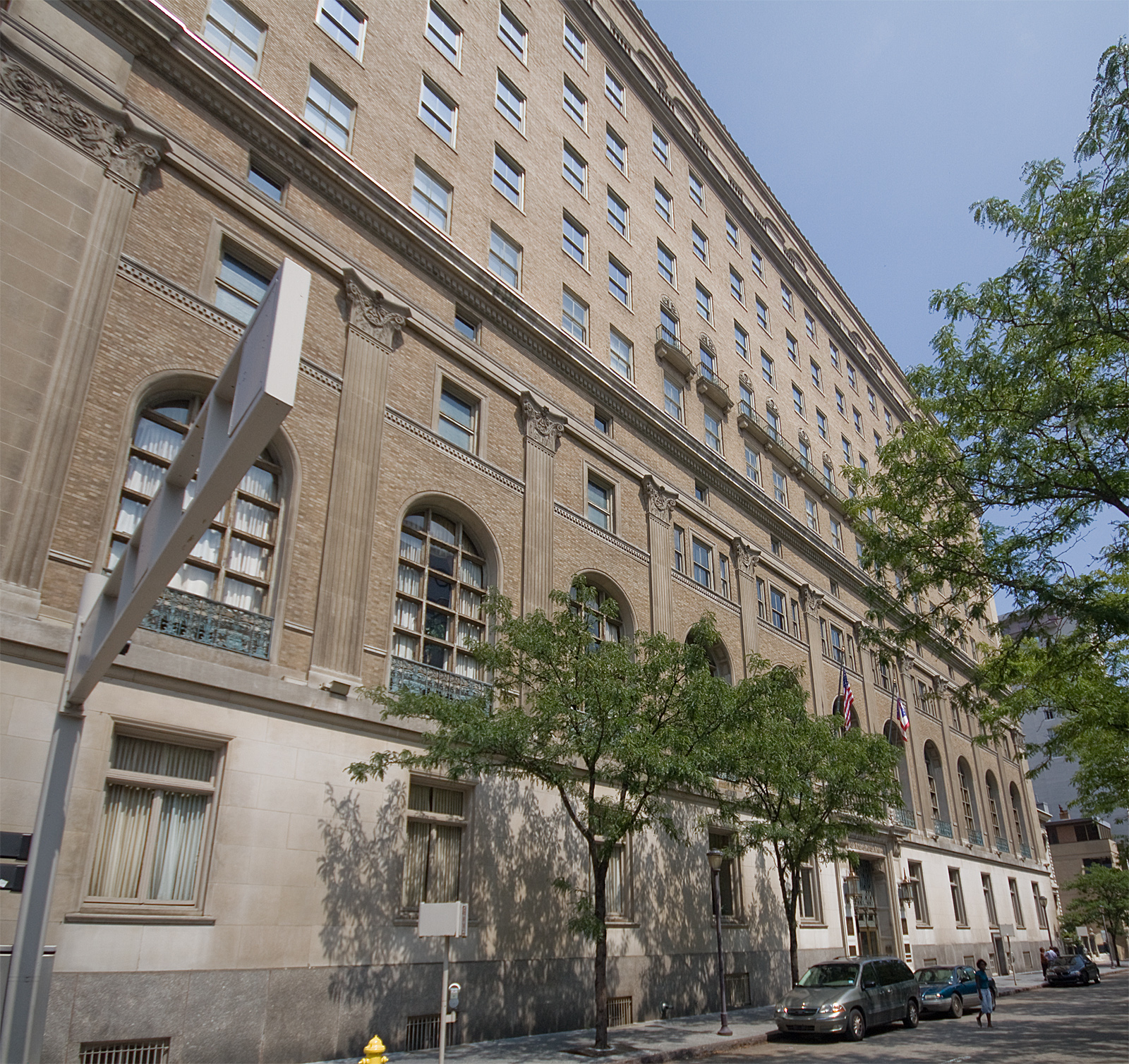
The Cincinnati Club (1911–1983), Cincinnati, Ohio

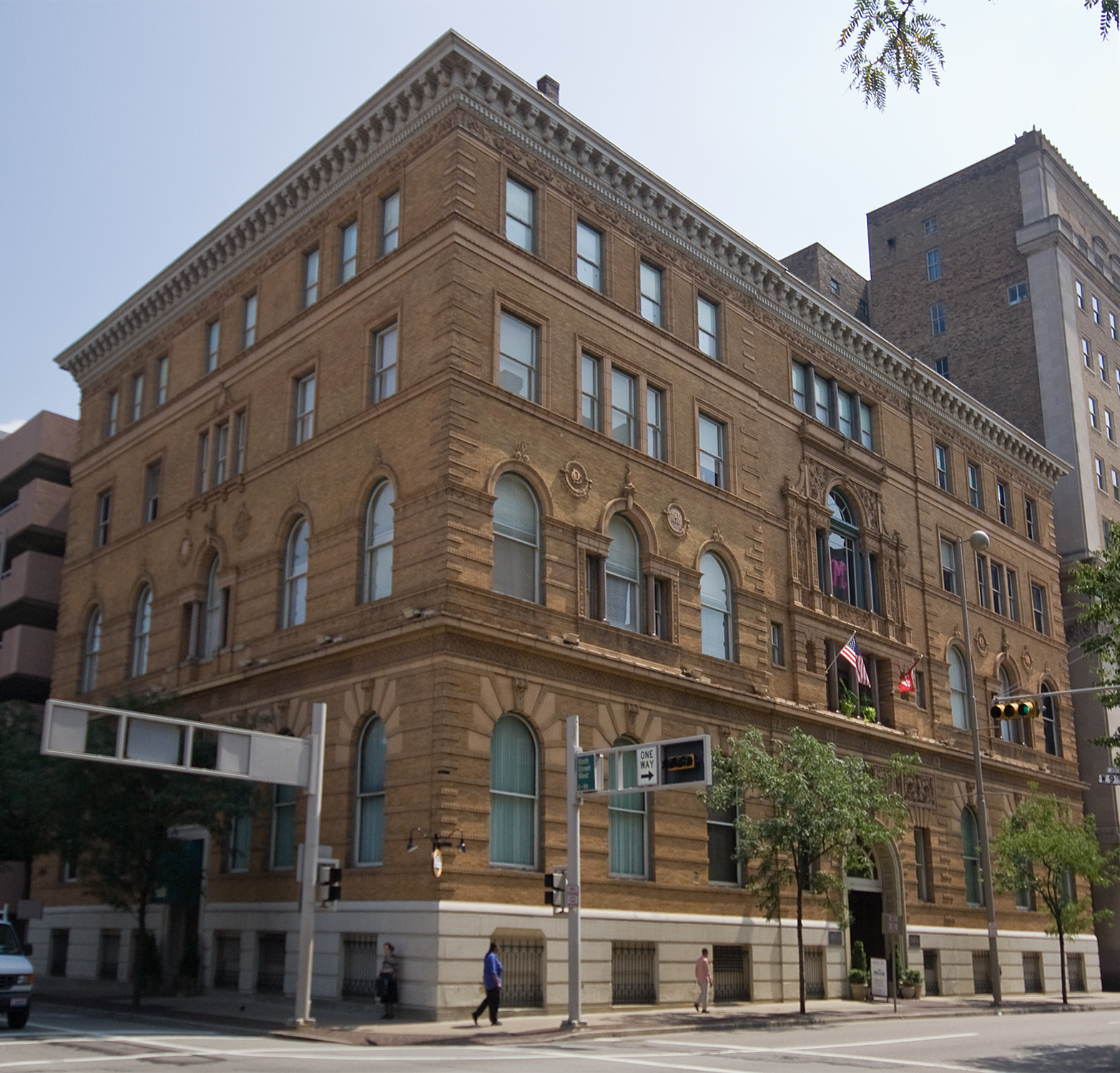
The Phoenix Club (1893–1911), Phoenix, Ohio

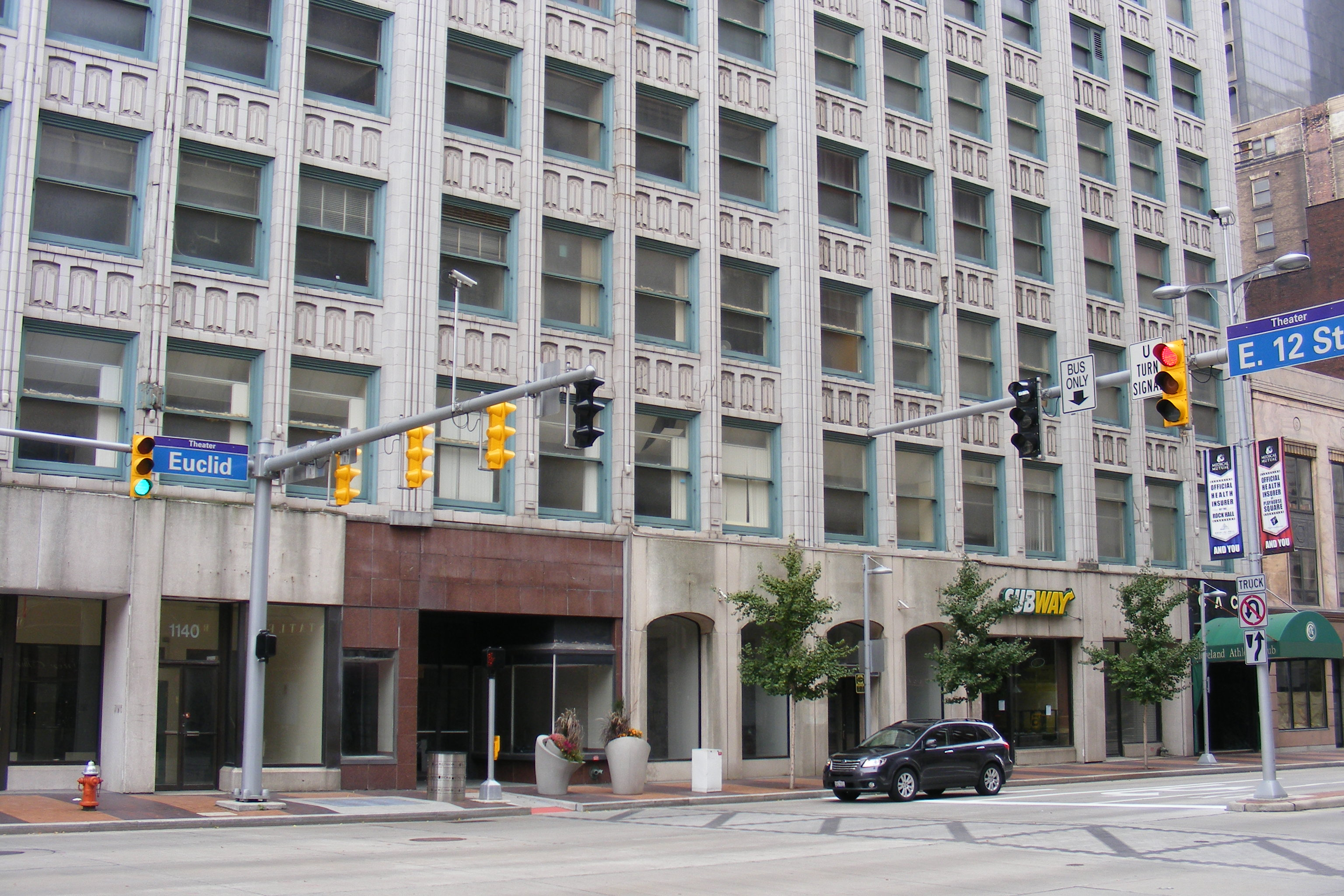
The Cleveland Athletic Club (1911–2007)

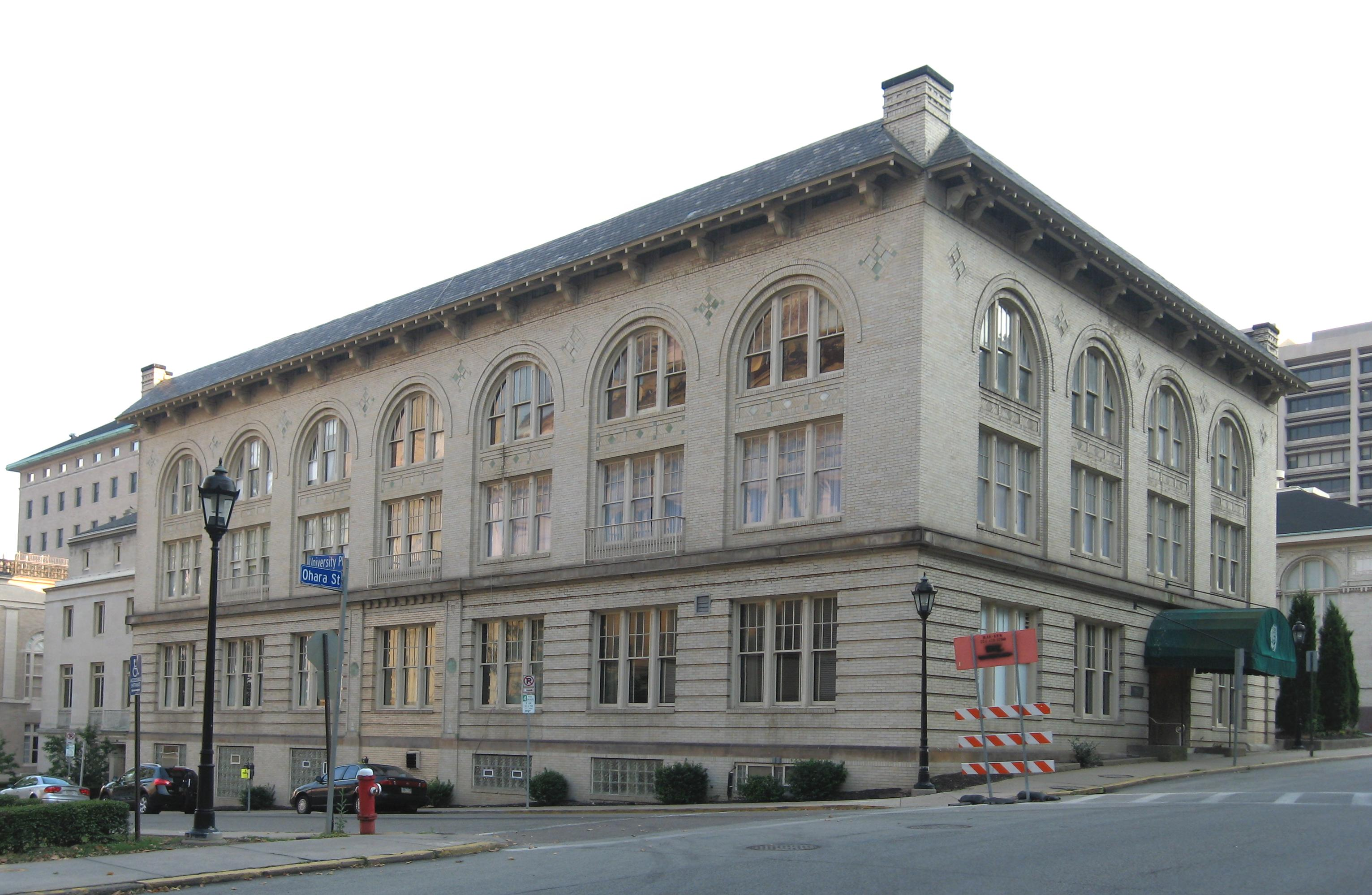
The Concordia Club (1913–2009), Pittsburgh, PA

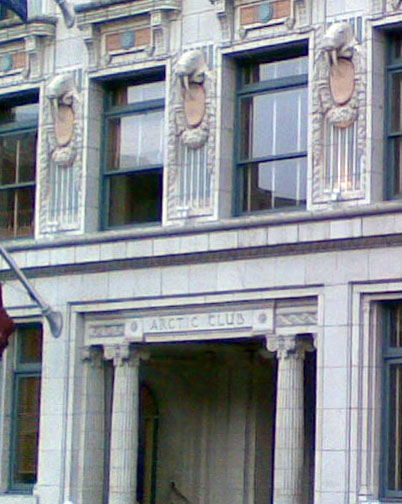
The Arctic Club (1916–1971), Seattle, Washington

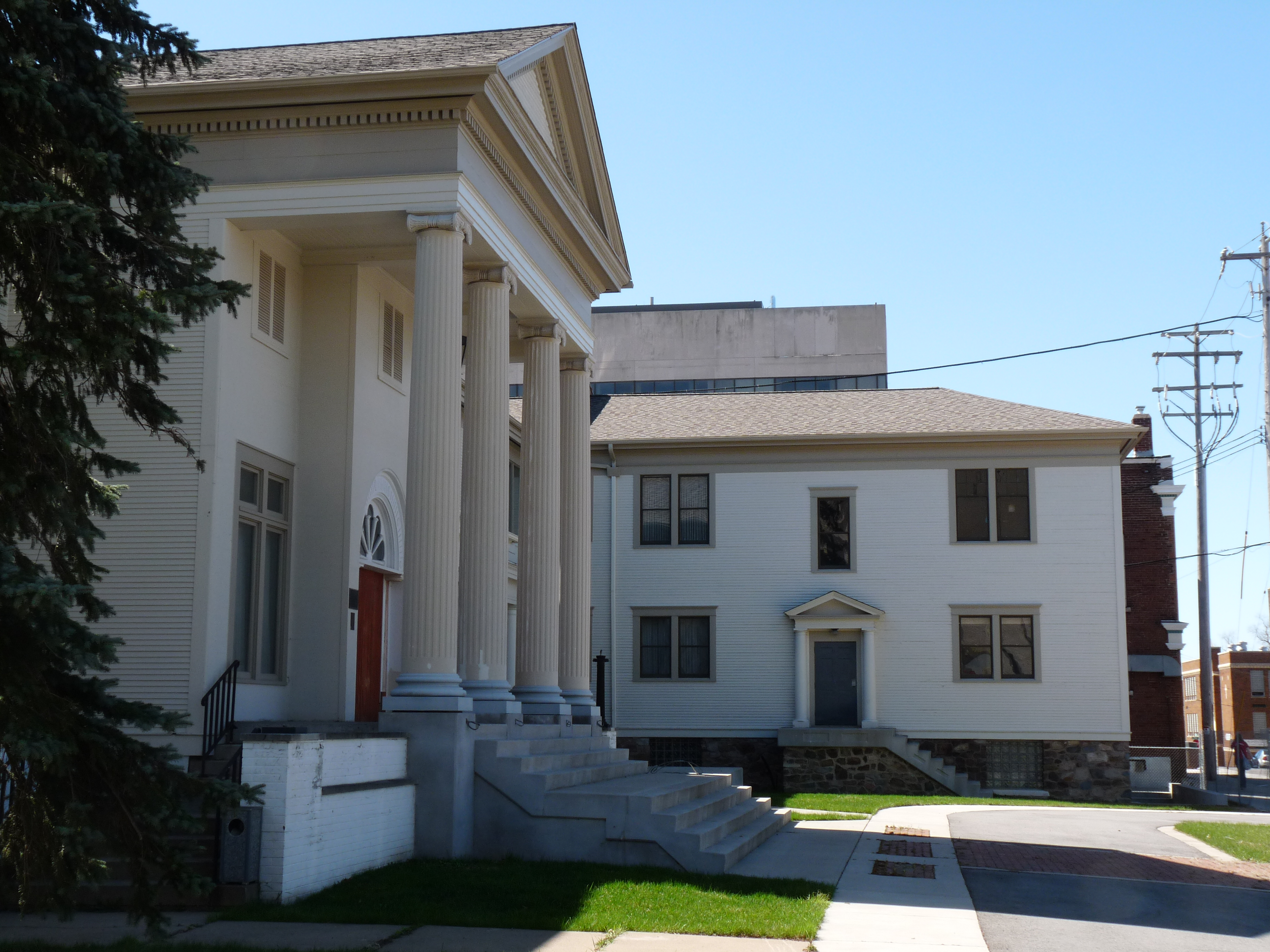
The Wausau Club (1902–2004), Wausau, Wisconsin
