= Frederick W. Stickney =

American architect

Frederick Warren Stickney (June 17, 1853 – January 18, 1918) was an American architect.

== Early years ==
Stickney was born in Lowell, Massachusetts, to Daniel and Betsey Stickney. He attended MIT and later worked at the New York office of William Robert Ware & Henry Van Brunt. At Ware & Van Brunt, Stickney worked alongside other MIT graduates, including Ware's son William Rotch Ware, Charles Allerton Coolidge, and George Foster Shepley.

== Career ==
In February 1882, Stickney joined about twenty other prominent young men of Lowell to form a gentleman's club called the Yorick Club, with him appointed as secretary. Other members included Fred C. Church and Percy Parker.

Stickney opened his office at 131 Devonshire Street in Boston, alongside at least a dozen other architectural firms on the same street, including Henry Van Brunt and Arthur Rotch.

In 1884, Stickney designed a summer cottage for Rev. H.T. Rose in Water Mill Long Island, which now stands as a part of the Southamptons. It is known as Rosemary Lodge and was added to the National Register of Historic Places in 2000.

In February 1886, Stickney's works were part of the first exhibition under the Boston Society of Architects held at the Boston Art Club Gallery.

In 1887–88, he was commissioned to design the Senter House that overlooks Lake Winnipesaukee.

In 1888–89, he was commissioned by George Aitken to design the main house for the Billing's Farm, which is now part of the Marsh-Billings-Rockefeller National Historic Park in Woodstock, Vermont.

In 1890–91, the City of Lowell hired Stickney to design the Lowell City Library, now known as the Pollard Memorial Library, in honor of the cities men who lost their lives in the American Civil War.

== Stickney & Austin (1892–1900) ==
In 1892, Stickney teamed up with architect William D. Austin, with Stickney working out of his Lowell office and Austin out of his Boston office. Even though the partnership ended in 1900, they both maintained each other's names in their respective practice. One of their first projects was the Highland Club in Lowell, Massachusetts.

In 1894, Stickney was commissioned by George Bullock for his Long Island residence out on Oyster Bay. It burned down five years later.

Stickney & Austin's designs include:

- The Nahant Beach Woman's Sanitary.
- The Revere Beach Bandstand, Bathhouse, Police Station, and Superintendent's House.

== Later years ==
In 1900, Stickney was made a member of the American Institute of Architects.

In 1915, he was re-hired to repair the Pollard Memorial Library in his home town of Lowell, after a disastrous fire.

== Examples of Works ==
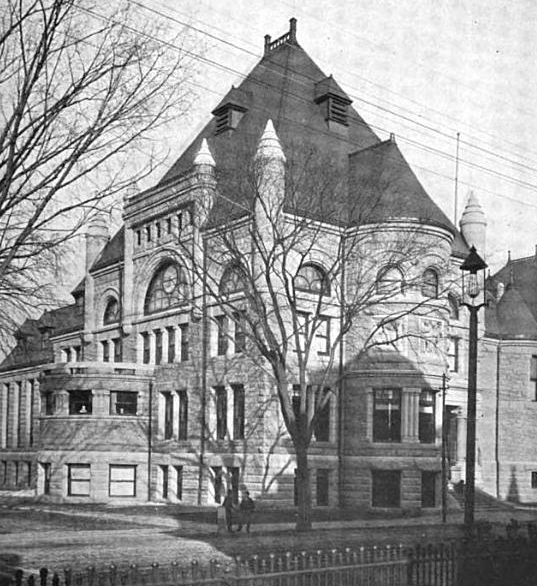
Lowell Public Library in 1899

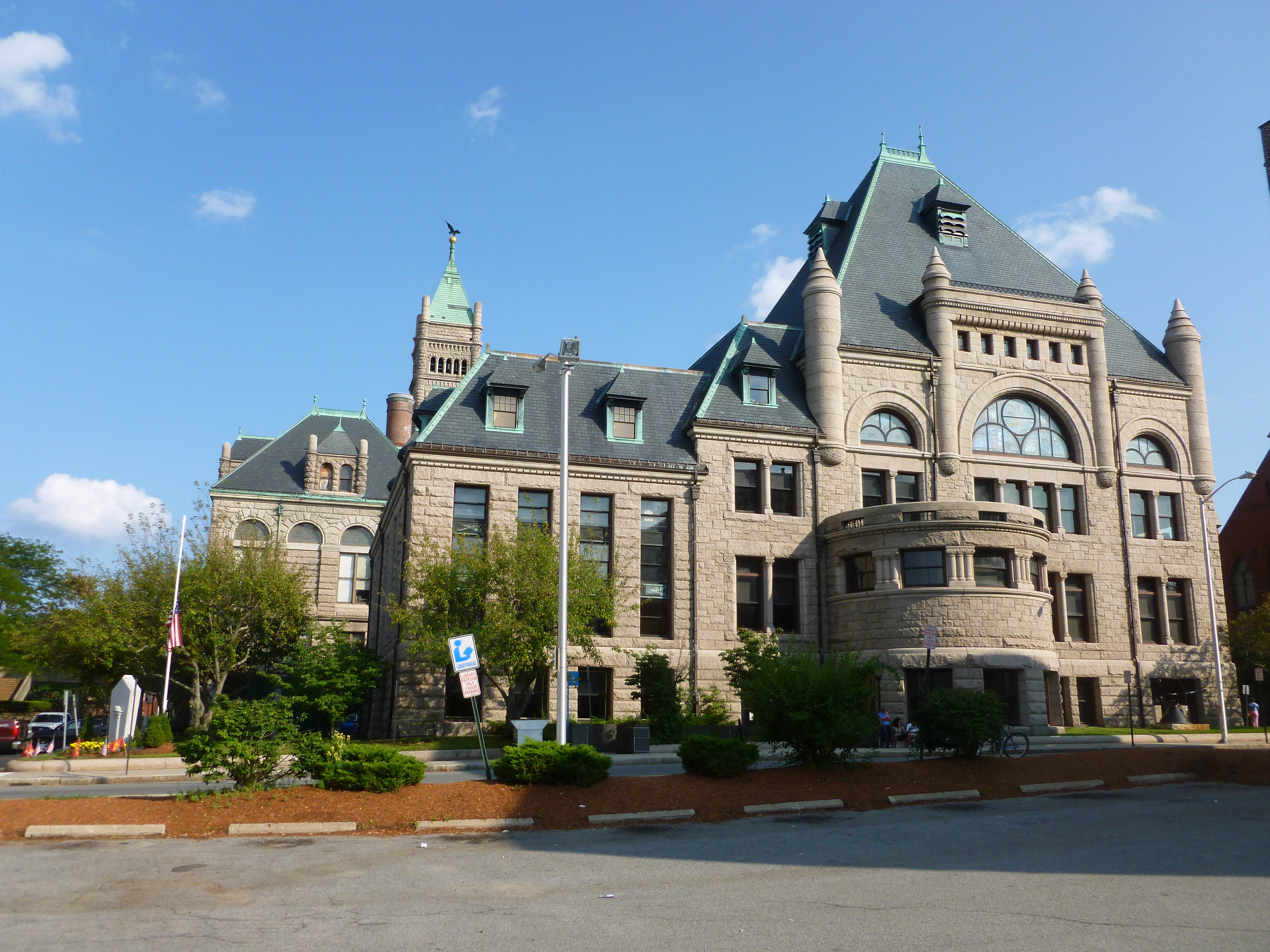
Pollard Memorial Library (Lowell, MA) in 2011

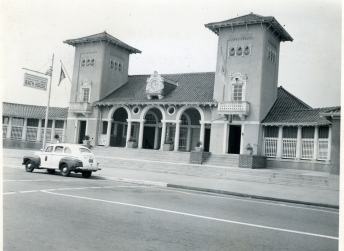
Nahant Beach Bathhouse

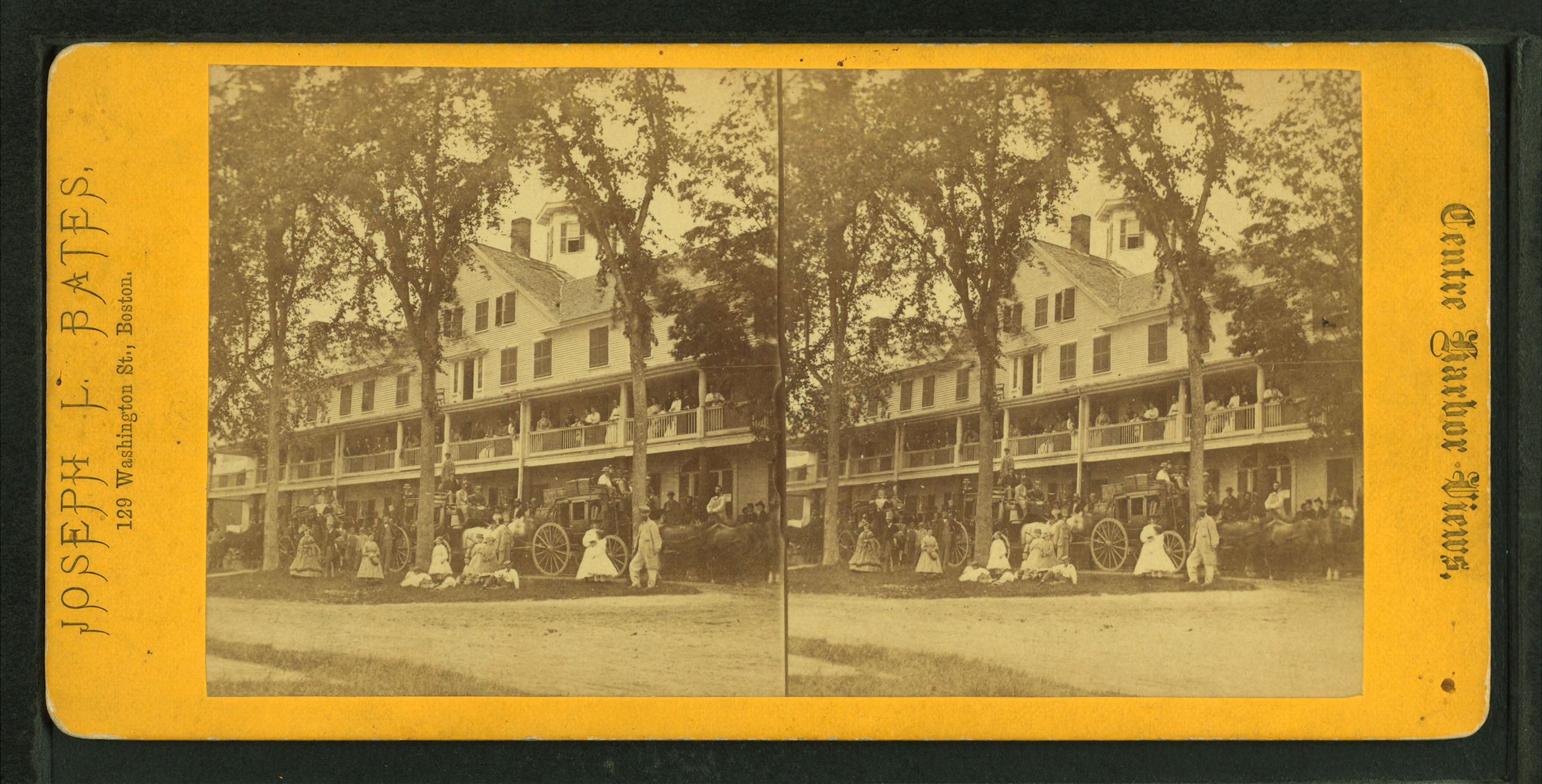
Senter House in Center Harbor, New Hampshire in stereoscopic image by Joseph L. Bates
