= U.S. Bank Tower (Lincoln, Nebraska) =

High-rise building in Lincoln, Nebraska

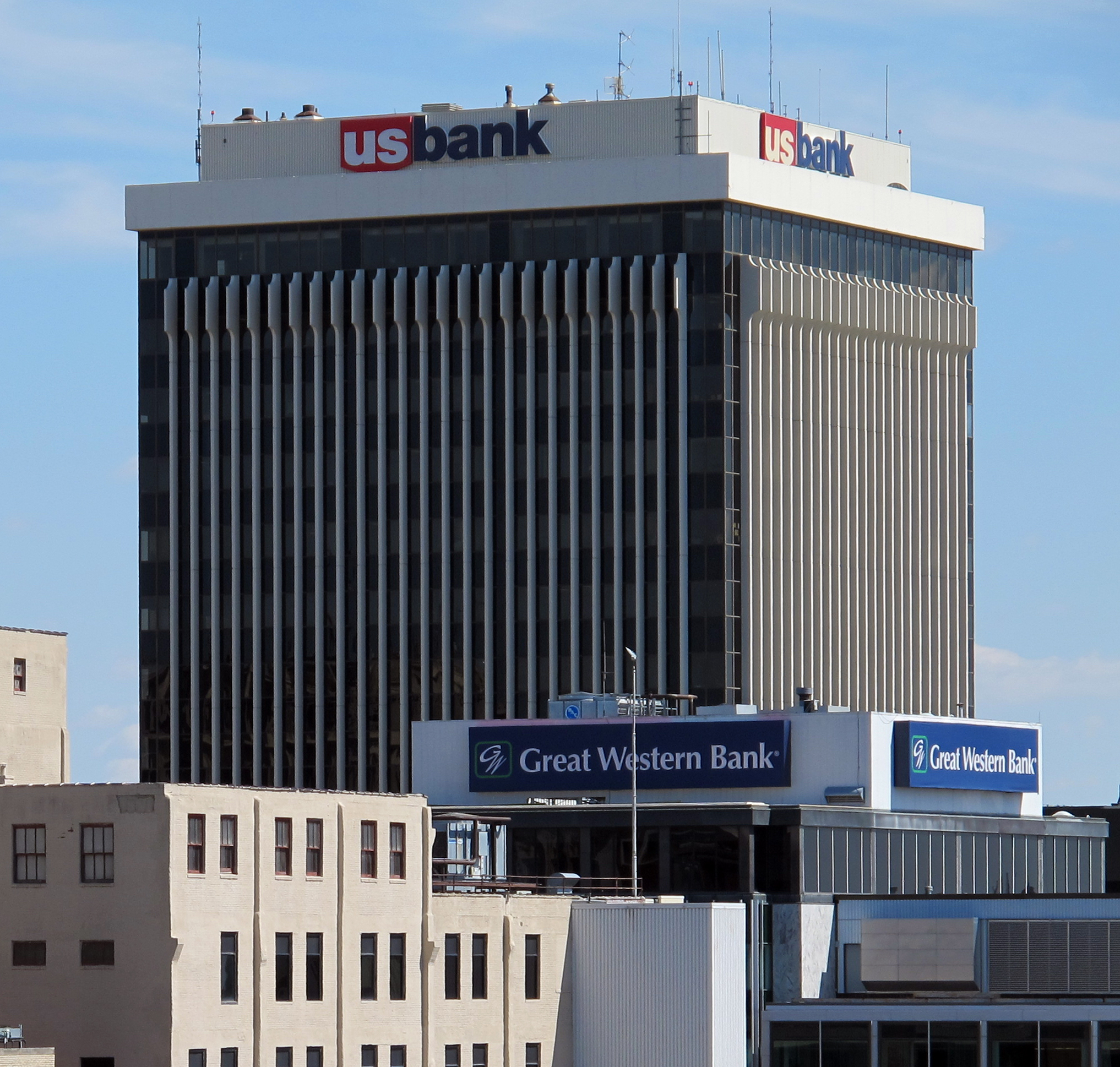
- U.S. Bank Tower in 2015
- Interactive map of the U.S. Bank Tower area

General information
- Location: Lincoln, Nebraska, U.S., 233 S 13th St.
- Coordinates: 40.81179°N 96.70303°W
- Opened: 1970

Height
- Height: 220 feet (67 m)

Technical details
- Floor count: 20

U.S. Bank Tower is a high-rise building in Lincoln, Nebraska, United States. The building opened in 1970 and was originally developed by First National of Lincoln. The building is currently named for U.S. Bancorp. At a height of 220 feet (67 m) tall, it is the third-tallest building in Lincoln, and is the fifteenth-tallest in the state.

== History ==
U.S. Bank Tower was originally announced in August 1968 and was built for First National of Lincoln. The building was originally known as the First National Bank Building. Construction began the following year. It was announced as the tallest commercial building in Lincoln. The tower opened in 1970 and was occupied by both First National of Lincoln, and the Nebraska Club, which moved from Hotel Cornhusker.

In 1997, following First National of Lincoln's merger with U.S. Bancorp, the building's name was changed to the U.S. Bank Building. Additionally, the logo was replaced to reflect the change. The Nebraska Club later vacated the building following its dissolution in 2020. In 2022, the building was sold from U.S. Bancorp to Crescent Investment Group and MAP Holdings.

== Design ==
The U.S. Bank Tower is 220 feet (67 m) tall and has twenty floors. It is the third tallest building in Lincoln, and is the fifteenth tallest in the state. The tower is made out of dark colored glass with white concrete beams extruding through each section. The 20th floor housed the Nebraska Club from 1970, to its dissolution in 2020. The Nebraska Club included a restaurant and office space.
