= Schimmel Hotels =

U.S. family-owned hotel chain 1915–1969

- Company type: Private
- Industry: Hospitality
- Founded: March 2, 1915; 110 years ago in Galesburg, Illinois
- Founder: Charles Schimmel
- Defunct: 1968
- Fate: Acquired by Radisson Hotels
- Number of locations: 9
- Key people: Charles Schimmel; A.Q. Schimmel; Walter Schimmel; Edward Schimmel; Bernard Schimmel; Mark Schimmel

The Schimmel Hotels chain was a group of nine luxury hotels located in seven cities in the Midwestern United States, owned and operated by the Schimmel family between 1915 and 1969, when the chain was sold to the Radisson Hotel group.

== Beginnings ==
Custer Hotel, Galesburg, Illinois

Charles Schimmel (1872–1938), an immigrant from Vienna, Austria, the son of a successful Vienna caterer, was the founder of the company. He built his first hotel in Galesburg, Illinois. The Custer opened on 2 March 1915. It was named not for the infamous U.S. Army officer, but for O.N. Custer, Galesburg newspaperman and community booster who arranged the financing of the project.

In its five stories, the Custer offered 100 rooms with modern plumbing and telephones (two more stories were added later). The hotel was considered luxurious; it boasted a dining room, drug store, barber shop, billiard room, ladies' parlor, and men's smoking room. Notable guests included Amelia Earhart and Carl Sandburg. In 1938, a seven-story addition was built on the adjacent lot, housing 60 additional rooms, a ballroom seating 400 patrons, and several private dining rooms.

== The Blackstone ==
Blackstone Hotel, Omaha, Neb.

In 1920, Schimmel bought the Blackstone Hotel, in Omaha, Nebraska. It was built in 1915 as a residential hotel. Schimmel converted it into a regular hotel as a "symbol of elegance", a premier hotel along the Lincoln Highway between Chicago and San Francisco. According to the Omaha Landmarks Heritage Preservation Commission, the hotel "published its own magazine, The Blackstonian, and maintained its own Pierce-Arrow, which met visiting dignitaries arriving by train."

The Blackstone was located in Omaha's Gold Coast area, a neighborhood said to have housed a preponderance of the city's cultural and financial leaders in the late 19th and early 20th centuries. Its premier restaurant, The Orleans Room, received Holiday magazine's Award of Excellence for sixteen years, the only Nebraska restaurant to do so.

The Blackstone hosted many famous guests, including Bob Hope, Jimmy Stewart, Eleanor Roosevelt, and Ronald Reagan. Then-Senator John F. Kennedy and his wife Jackie celebrated their fifth wedding anniversary at the hotel. Richard Nixon announced his candidacy for the presidency in the hotel's grand ballroom.

The Reuben sandwich is said to have been first created at the Blackstone. According to Mary Bernstein, granddaughter of founder Charles Schimmel:

My father, Bernard Schimmel, had just returned from school in Switzerland where he trained to be a chef. His father, Charles, held a weekly poker game at the Blackstone on Sunday nights. He said to my dad, "Reuben [Kulakofsky, local grocer and one of the poker players] wants you to make some sandwiches with corned beef and sauerkraut."

And my dad put together this concoction of corned beef, Swiss cheese, sauerkraut, Thousand Island dressing and dark rye bread and grilled them, then took them to the poker players. After it later received such wide acclaim, they decided to put it on the menu at the Schimmel hotels and call it the Reuben sandwich, because Reuben Kulakofsky had requested it.

== Family and expansion ==
Cornhusker Hotel, Lincoln, Neb.

Schimmel and his wife Mary had six children—four sons and two daughters (one of whom died in infancy). Charles Schimmel envisioned that his sons each would someday manage his own hotel. To that end, the eldest, Abram Quincy, known as A.Q., assisted his father in the management of the Blackstone.

In 1930, Schimmel acquired the Cornhusker Hotel in Lincoln, Nebraska, a new and modern facility with 300 rooms. A.Q. Schimmel became its managing director.

Hotel Lassen, Wichita, Kansas

By 1942, Schimmel managed leased operations of the Hotel Kings-Way in St. Louis, where his second son, Walter, was in training. Also in 1942, Schimmel acquired the Lassen Hotel in Wichita, Kansas, which Walter took over in management. The Lassen was built in 1918 and was listed on the National Register of Historic Places in 1984.

== Next generation ==
Upon the deaths of Charles and Mary Schimmel, the two younger brothers, Edward and Bernard, assumed management of the Blackstone and Custer, respectively, through the World War II years.

By the summer of 1950, the four Schimmel hotels were selected by Hotel Management, the industry trade magazine, for its tenth annual study of typical American hotels. To qualify for the study, hotels must be "outstanding in every operational aspect", and "far above average in service and courtesy".

In the fall of 1950, Schimmel began managing the Town House, a multi-million-dollar facility in Kansas City, Kansas, constructed through subscription of local funding as the community's first commercial hotel. Schimmel ended its management of the Town House on September 1, 1963. The hotel subsequently went through ownership changes, and ultimately was foreclosed on and sold at auction.

In May 1953, the Schimmel brothers purchased the 175-room Lincoln-Douglas Hotel in Quincy, Illinois. The hotel was acquired from another in-state hotel family, C. Hayden Davis, his son, J. Hayden Davis, and their wives, of Springfield, Illinois. The Davis family owned the Abraham Lincoln Hotel in Springfield and the Hotel Quincy.

In the spring of 1960, the Schimmel Inn opened in Wichita, Kansas. The motor inn was sold at a foreclosure sale in June 1967.

Indian Hills Inn, Omaha, Neb.

In February 1961, Schimmel announced plans to construct a motor hotel on Dodge Road in the Indian Hills area of west Omaha, at an estimated cost of $6 million. In 1962, Schimmel's Indian Hills Inn opened in Omaha, owned by Michael J. Ford and leased to Schimmel. In June 1964, The Rolling Stones stayed at the inn on their first American tour.

In the summer of 1961, Schimmel sold the Custer Hotel to the Chicago management firm, Delrock Management Co. Bernard Schimmel, managing director of the hotel, planned to move to Omaha in order to supervise Schimmel's Indian Hills Inn.

== Third generation and denouement ==
Mark Schimmel, the third generation of family innkeepers, was appointed manager of the Blackstone on September 1, 1966. He was the son of Edward Schimmel.

The Indian Hills Inn operated until it was sold to Omaha Methodist Hospital in 1968. The property was converted to housing for the hospital's School of Nursing.

The Radisson Hotel Corp. purchased the remaining hotel group from the Schimmel family in 1969.

A.Q. Schimmel died in Tucson, Arizona, October 22, 1970, at age 67.

Edward Schimmel died of a heart attack in Tucson, on February 10, 1975, where he had relocated after the sale of Schimmel Hotels six years earlier.

Bernard Schimmel died in Omaha on February 16, 1977, at age 67.

Walter Schimmel died in Wichita on April 27, 1990, at age 84.

Mark Schimmel died from the effects of Parkinson's disease on March 29, 2016, at age 77. He lived near New Melle, Missouri, in his later years, after having spent his career in the hotel industry.

== Schimmel Hotels ==
- Custer Hotel – Galesburg IL (1915) (now the Kensington, a supportive living home)
- Blackstone – Omaha NE (1920) (now the Kimpton Cottonwood Hotel)
- Cornhusker – Lincoln NE (1930) (demolished 1983 and rebuilt: now the Lincoln Marriott Cornhusker Hotel)
- Hotel Kings-Way – St. Louis MO (1942) (demolished 1973)
- Lassen Hotel – Wichita KS (1942) (now vacant)
- Town House – Kansas City KS (1951) (now Cross Lines Tower, a retirement home)
- Hotel Lincoln Douglas – Quincy IL (1953) (now an apartment building)
- Schimmel Inn – Wichita KS (1960) (demolished 1996)
- Indian Hills Inn – Omaha NE (1962) (demolished 2022)
