= Frederic Cameron Church Jr. =

American businessman (1897–1983)

- Born: May 22, 1897; Lowell, Massachusetts, U.S.
- Died: November 14, 1983 (aged 86); Beverly, Massachusetts, U.S.
- Occupation: Businessman
- Football career

Profile
- Position: Running back

Career information
- College: Harvard (1916–1920)

Awards and highlights
- National champion (1919)

Frederic Cameron Church Jr. (May 22, 1897 – November 14, 1983) was an American businessman. His father founded Fred C. Church Insurance company in 1865 as a sole proprietorship in Lowell, Massachusetts. Fred. C. Church, Inc. currently has around 130 employees, with branch offices in Andover, Massachusetts, Dracut, Massachusetts, Haverhill, Massachusetts, Tewksbury, Massachusetts, Westford, Massachusetts, and Portsmouth, New Hampshire.

== History ==
In February 1882, Fred C. Church (Sr) joined about twenty other prominent young men of Lowell to form a gentleman's club called the Highland Club, later named the "Yorick Club", with, other members included architect, Frederick W. Stickney and Percy Parker.

Fred Church set up shop in down town Lowell, at 53 Central Street in the Center Block building.

His son, Fred C. Church Jr., attended Harvard in 1916, where he was very popular, elected 1920 Class President, and a star member of the Football team scoring the winning touchdown against Oregon to win the national championship in 1920. He was also played on the Crimson Hockey team where he was captain and was also on the track team. In 1920, F.C. Jr. was acting first marshal at the Harvard Commencement exercises. He continued his education after serving in the Navy during World War I and graduated from Harvard in 1922.

Fred Jr. was poised to take over the business, as described by the July 3, 1920, article, in "The Standard" as;

"F.C.Jr," comes of first grade successful stock. Ask any company doing business with the Church Agency.

In July 1925, with 400 of societies' elite in attendance, Fred Jr. married into the wealthy Vanderbilt family, in Newport, RI, as first husband to the "Golden Girl" Muriel Vanderbilt. They resided at "Dudley Place" in Newport, which was her father's wedding present, and where she kept her show horses. They divorced four years later. According to the March 18, 1929 Time magazine article, "on grounds of nonsupport." By 1931, Ms. Vanderbilt was on her second husband.

In 1928, Fred Jr. teamed up with two others to form Boit, Dalton & Church Insurance located on 40 Kilby Street in Boston. According to a January 19, 1948 Life magazine article, Fred Jr. remarried Agnes Devens Boardman, and had five children with his wife and resided on Beacon Street in Boston.

In 1936, Fred Jr. helped form summer camps for the Boys Clubs in Boston, and in 1956, he was one of the founding fathers of the Boys & Girls Clubs of America. He also served as President of Boys Clubs of Boston for 20 years. Also, in 1956, the Frederic C. Church Foundation, was established in Boston (1956–1966). Fred Jr. served as general chairman of the Greater Boston Development Committee whose work lead to the establishment of the Boston Port Authority, to the construction of Route 128 around Boston and to the construction of the Mystic-Tobin bridge.

In 1968, Fred. C. Church, Inc. was organized as a domestic profit corporation, registering in Massachusetts. Currently it one of New England's largest privately owned, independent insurance agencies, with its principal office located at 41 Wellman Street in Connector Park in Lowell, MA.
