= The Lincoln Marriott Cornhusker Hotel =

Hotel in Lincoln, Nebraska, U.S.

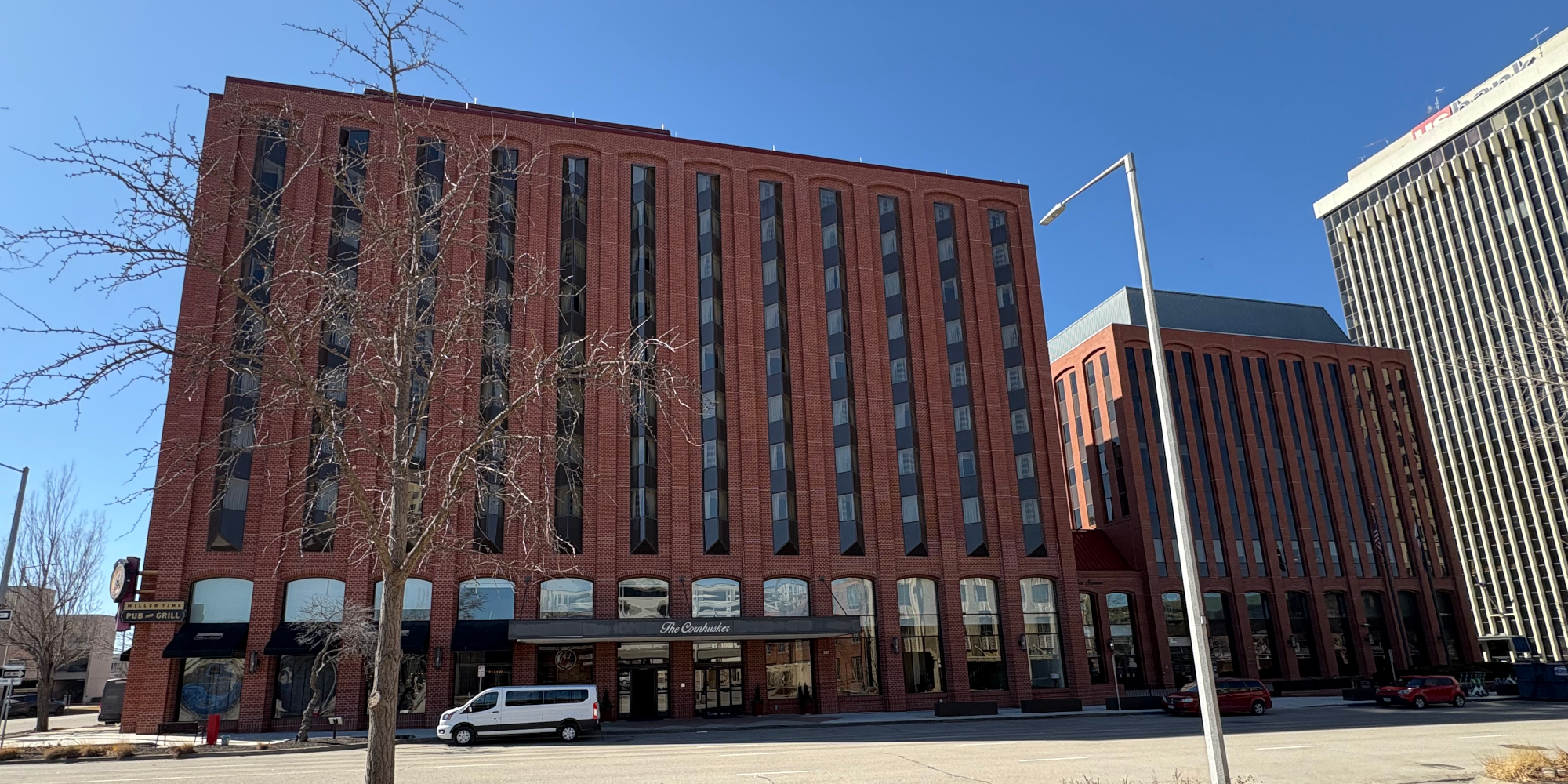
- The Cornhusker Hotel in 2025

General information
- Location: Lincoln, Nebraska, U.S., 333 S 13th St.
- Coordinates: 40.81060971775142°N 96.70301671793068°W
- Groundbreaking: 1982
- Opened: December 21, 1983

Technical details
- Floor count: 10

The Lincoln Marriott Cornhusker Hotel, commonly referred to as the Cornhusker Hotel, is a hotel in Lincoln, Nebraska, United States. The hotel opened in December 1983 and became a Marriott Hotel in 2005. The hotel replaced the previous Hotel Cornhusker, which was built in 1926 and was imploded in 1982 to make way for the current development.

== History ==
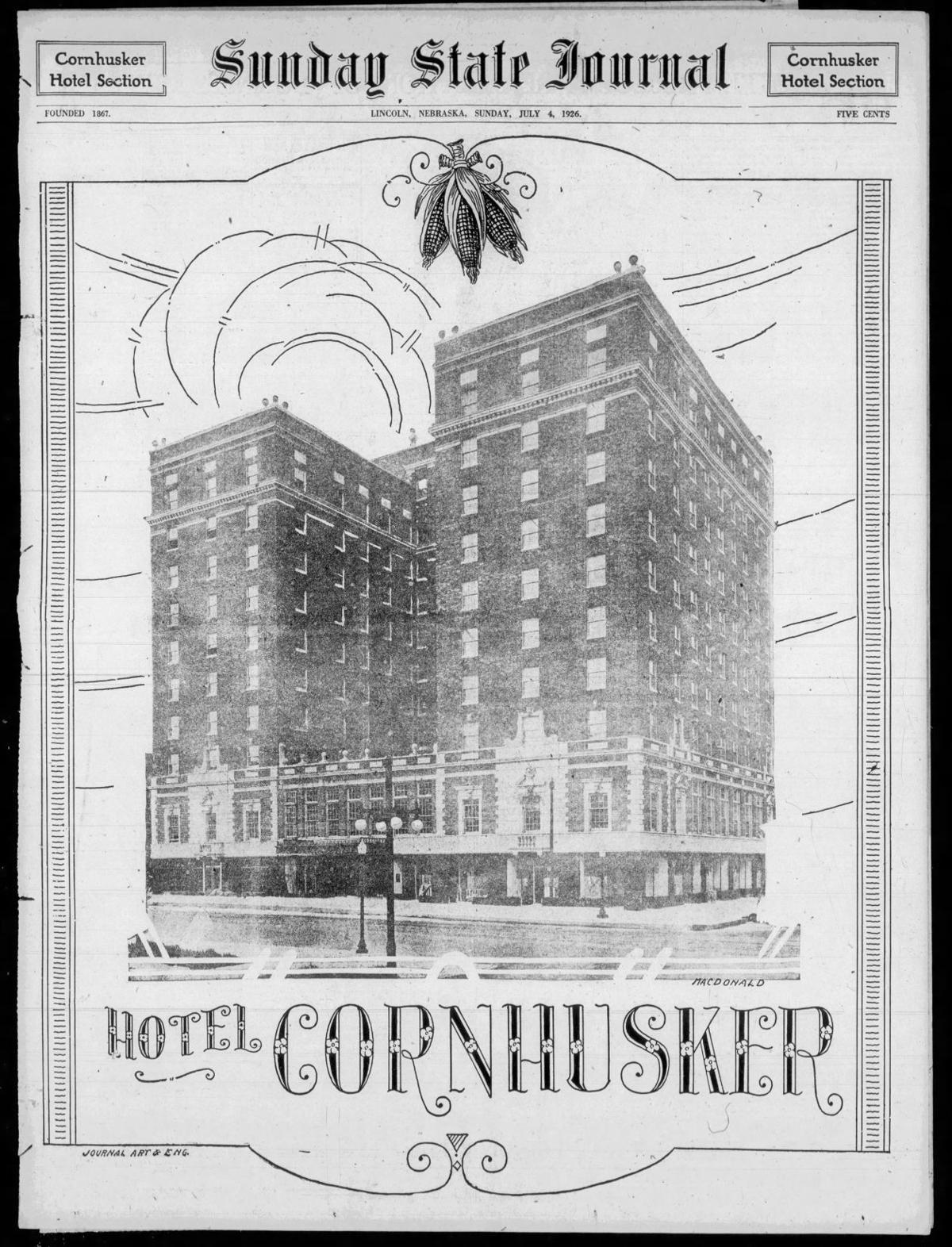
Hotel Cornhusker in 1926

=== Original hotel ===
The original Cornhusker Hotel was announced in July 1925 and was built on the site of the former First Presbyterian church. The hotel was contained 350 rooms and had twelve floors. The hotel opened on July 6, 1926 as Hotel Cornhusker. In 1930, the hotel was purchased by A.Q. Schimmel, then-owner of the Blackstone Hotel in Omaha. From 1954 to 1970, the hotel was the headquarters of the Nebraska Club.

The Radisson Hotel Corp. purchased the hotel from the Schimmel family in 1969.

In 1978, it was announced that the hotel would close and would subsequently be demolished. This was largely due claims from the owners that it would not be economically realistic to save the property. The hotel closed that same year and was sold to First National Bank of Omaha for full redevelopment of the block. Hotel Cornhusker was imploded on February 20, 1982.

=== Current hotel ===
After Hotel Cornhusker closed in 1978, plans for redevelopment, including the current hotel were announced. Headed by Los Angeles developer David Murdock, the replacement was originally known as Cornhusker Square, and also included a convention center and office space. Construction began immediately after Hotel Cornhusker was imploded. The hotel was the first in Lincoln to be built using tax increment financing. The hotel officially opened on December 21, 1983.

In April 2005, the hotel's owners put the hotel under the Marriott franchise. However, in 2012, Marriott pulled the franchise due to the owners failure to complete renovations. Later that year, the hotel was purchased by Marcus Hotels and Resorts, underwent renovations, and was added back as a Marriott Hotel. During the COVID-19 pandemic, the hotel closed in March 2020 and re-opened in August of that same year. In March 2025, it was announced that the convention center would be rebuilt in a new location across the street of the hotel.

== Design ==
The original Hotel Cornhusker had twelve floors and included 350 rooms. It was built using bricks, stone, and terracotta. The current hotel has ten floors and includes 297 rooms. The development includes the hotel, a seven story office building, parking garage, three-story atrium, and a convention center.
