= Pollard Memorial Library =

Public library in Lowell, Massachusetts, USA

Samuel Pollard Memorial Library
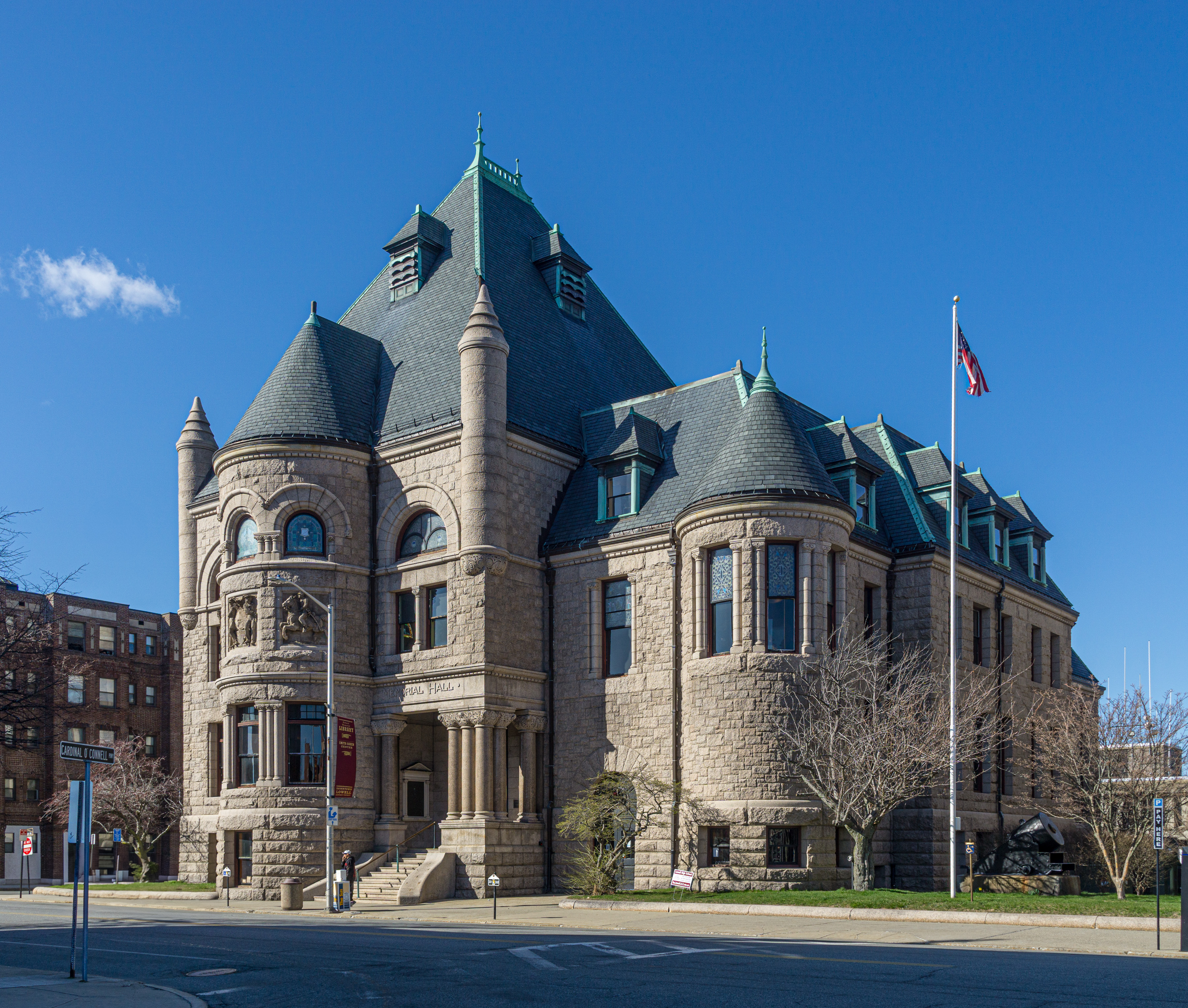
- 2014
- 42°38′47″N 71°18′53″W
- Location: Lowell, MA, United States
- Type: Public
- Established: 1893
- Architect: Frederick W. Stickney
- Branches: 1

Collection
- Size: 252,467

Access and use
- Circulation: 225,939
- Population served: 108,522

Other information
- Budget: $1, 337, 024
- Director: Bidget Cooley
- Employees: 23
- Website: https://lowelllibrary.org/

Samuel Pollard Memorial Library or Pollard Memorial Library is the main branch of the public library in Lowell, Massachusetts.

== History ==
The Lowell Public Library was established on May 20, 1844 with between 3,000-3,500 volumes. It was originally named the City School Library. The state of Massachusetts provided $1,200 for the budget and the city provided $2,300. It was set up in the first floor of the Old City Hall, 226 Merrimack St and opened for the first time on February 11, 1845. The library was renamed the City Library of Lowell in 1860. In 1872, the expanding collection was relocated down the street to the Hosford Building at 134 Merrimack St. In 1890–1891. The City of Lowell hired local Architect Frederick W. Stickney to design the new Lowell City Library, also known as Memorial Hall, in honor of the city's men who lost their lives in the American Civil War. The building was in the Richardsonian Romanesque style. The cornerstones of the building, along with those of City Hall next door, were laid on October 11, 1890 and it took three years to complete the building. The grand opening of Memorial Hall was on June 3, 1893.

In 1915 the second floor of the building was destroyed by a fire. The reported loss for the library was $67,627.20 worth of material as well as artifacts and relics. The building was rebuilt with Stickney and Harry Prescott Graves hired to plan the reconstruction. Military murals by French artist Paul Philippoteaux were installed on the second floor. In 1981, the library was renamed the Pollard Memorial Library in memory of the late Mayor Samuel S. Pollard. In 2000–2002 the building was remodeled for $10 million to modernize the building.

Jack Kerouac was a frequent visitor to the library as a teenager. He often skipped classes to read at the library. In February 2015 the library dedicated a spot in the library as the Kerouac Corner in honor of the author.

In early January 2018, pipes burst in the reference room of the library, causing extensive damage throughout the building. The alarm system failed to notify city officials, leaving the water pouring over the course of a weekend until it was discovered on Monday. The flood destroyed countless books and records, some of which were sent to archivists to be restored. The library underwent construction to repair the damaged rooms, remaining closed for several weeks until it reopened near the beginning of March.

=== Past library directors ===
- Josiah Hubbard 1845–1860
- Frederick A. Chase 1897
- Hugh Downey 1943–1969
- Mary Johnson-Lally 1995–2003
- Victoria Woodley 2008-2022
- Dory Lewis (acting) 2022-2023
- Stephen Robichaud 2023-2024
- Bridget Cooley (2024- )

== Gallery ==
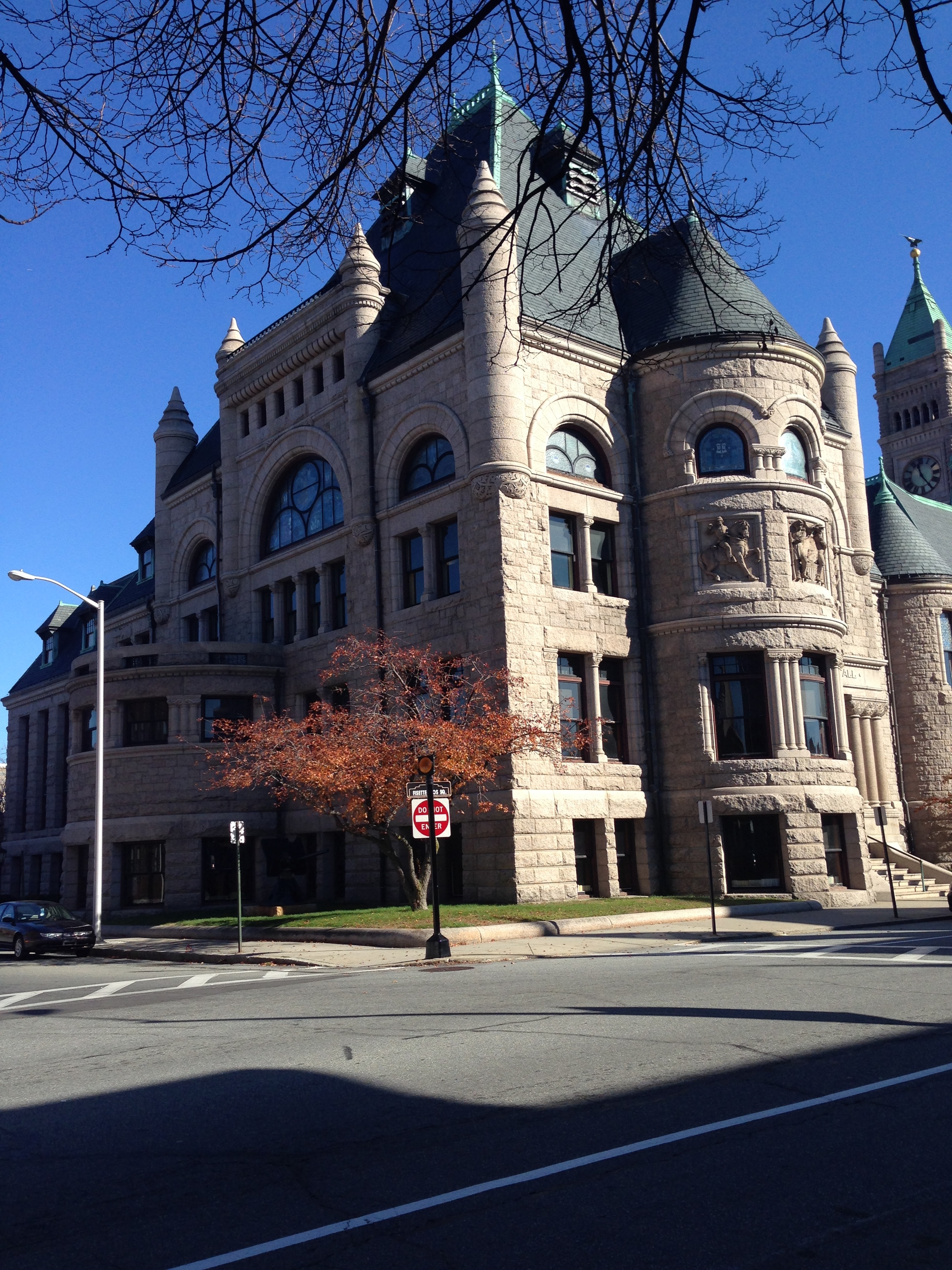
Front and Side entrance to PML

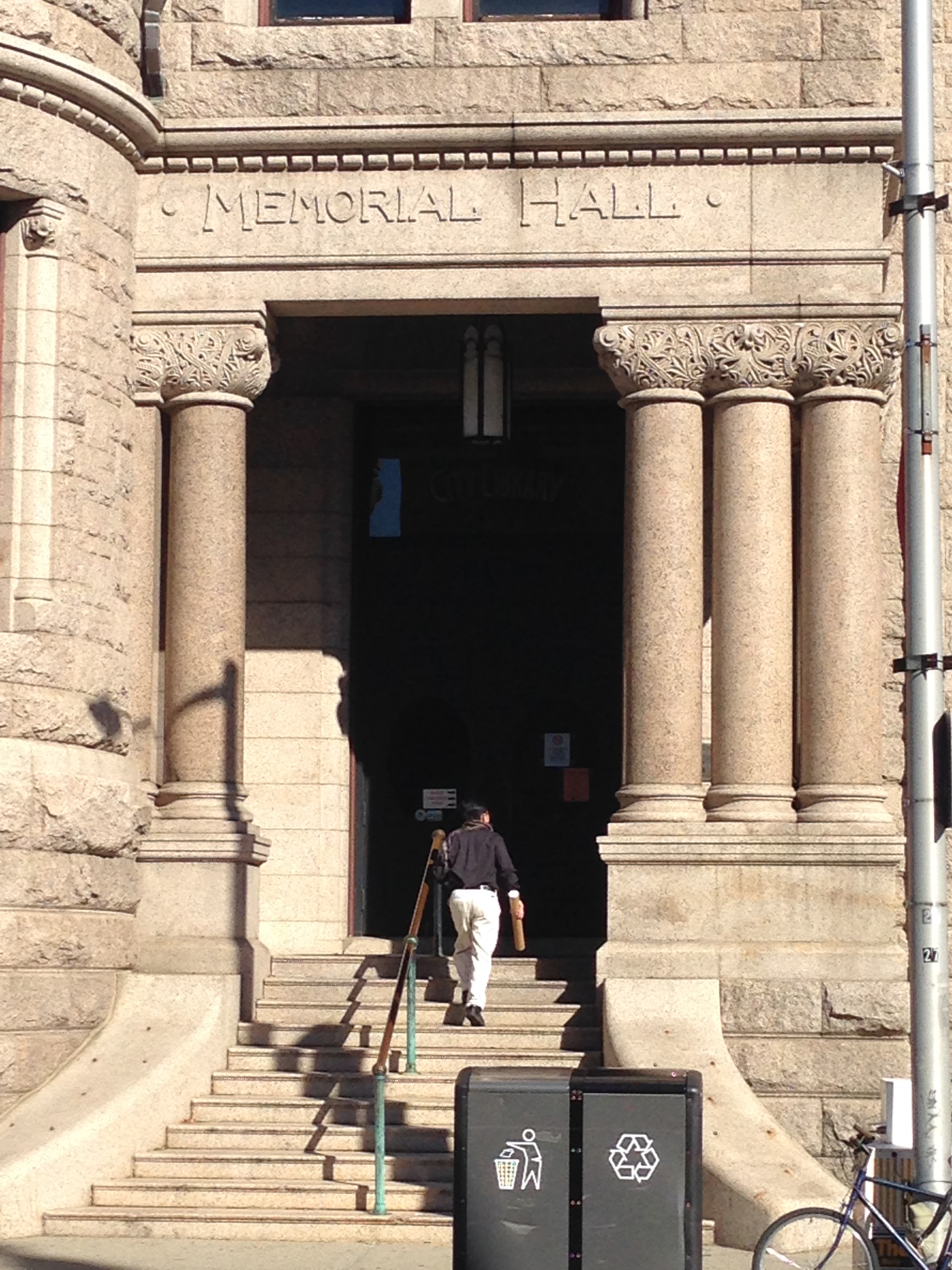
Memorial hall entrance to Pollard Memorial Library

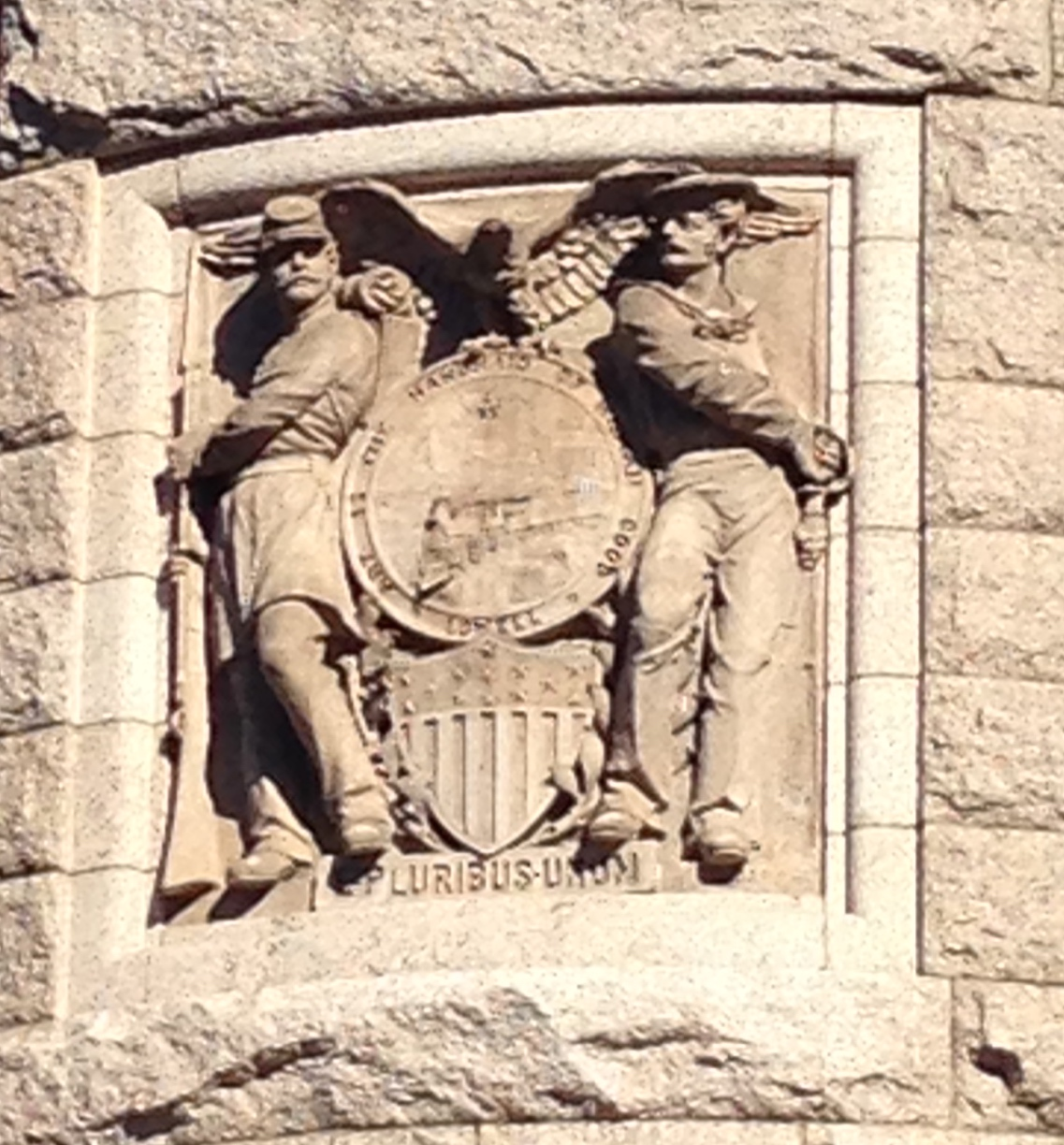
Second relief pollard memorial library

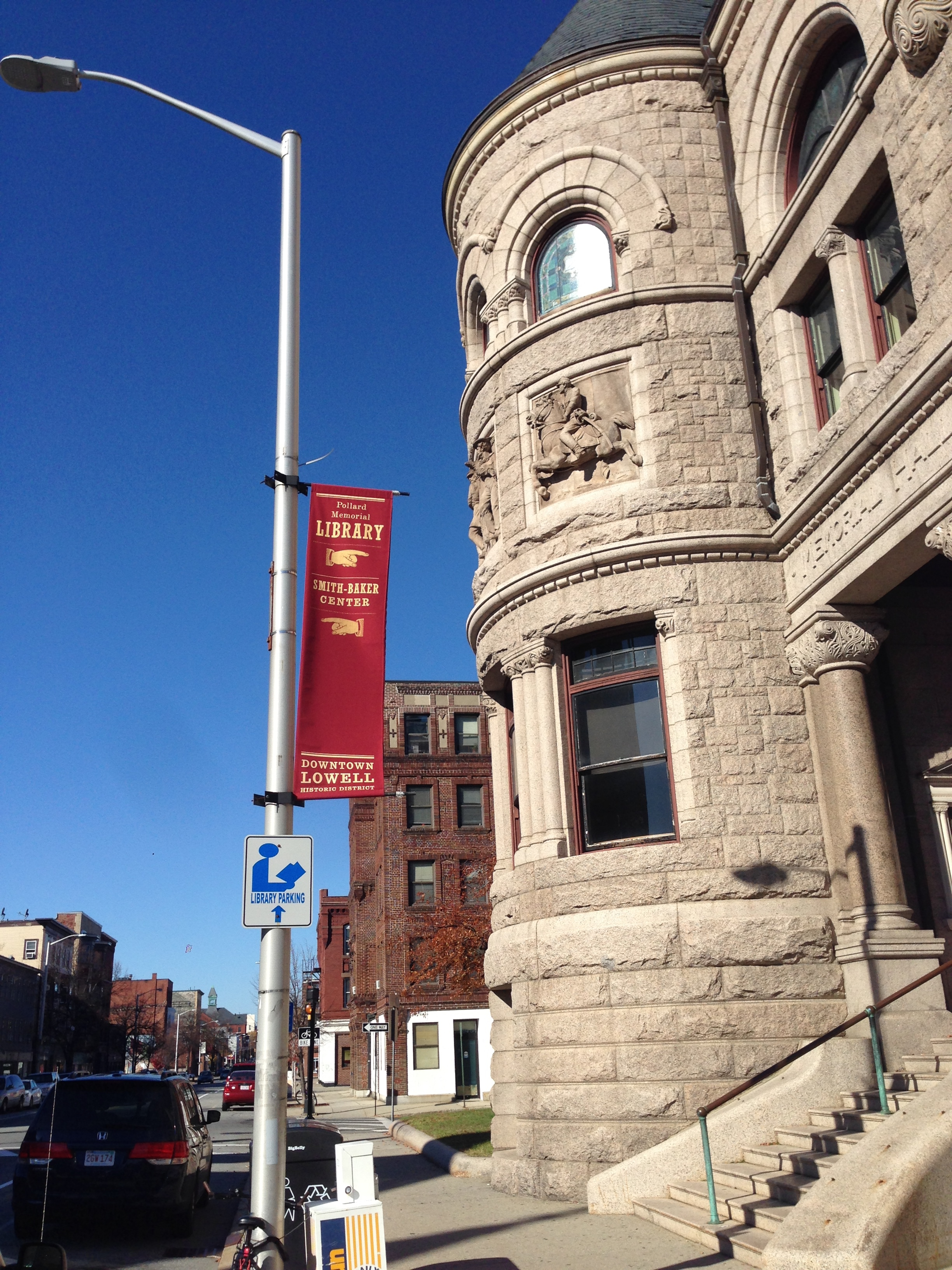
Entrance to Pollard Memorial Library

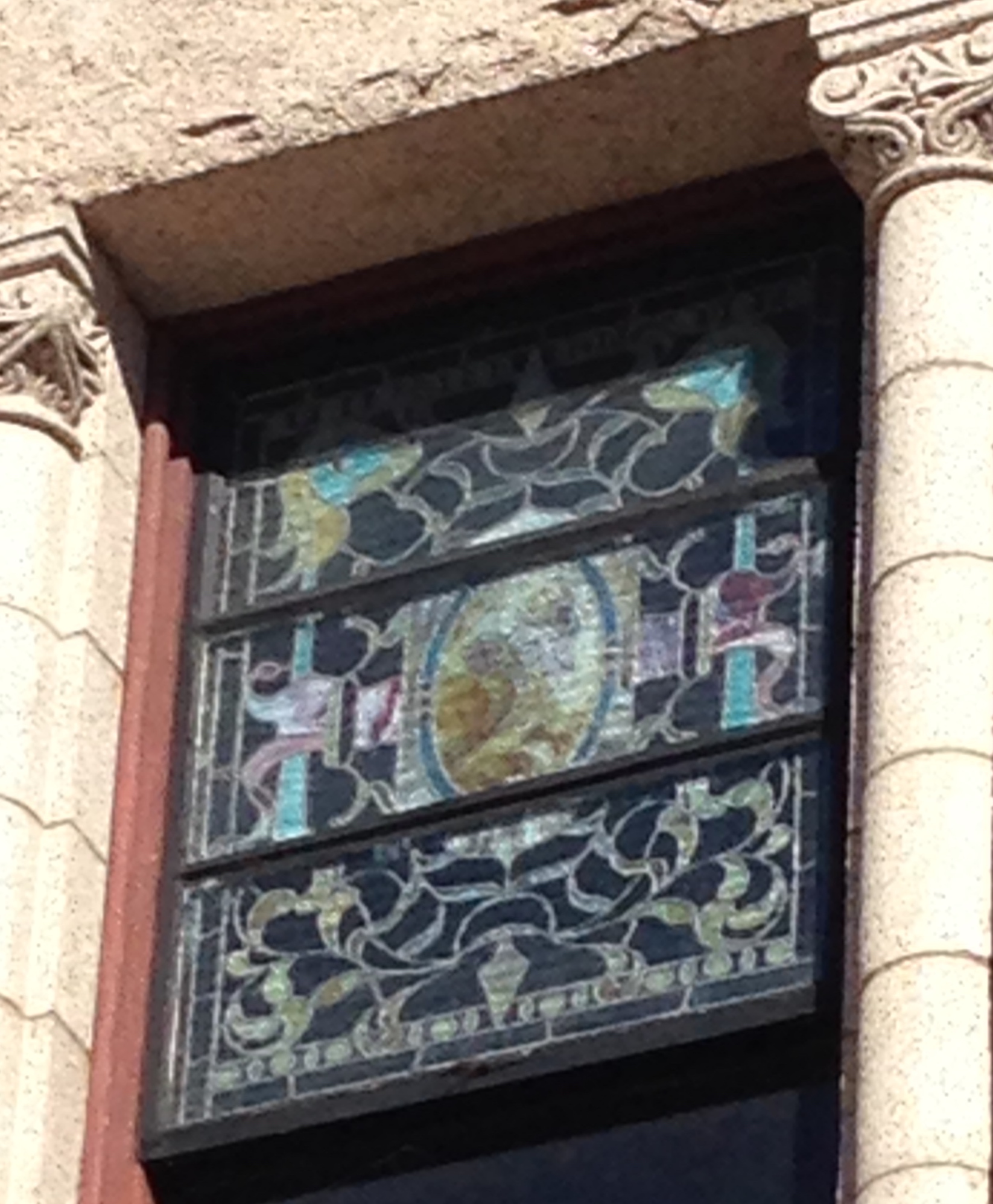
Stained glass Pollard Memorial Library

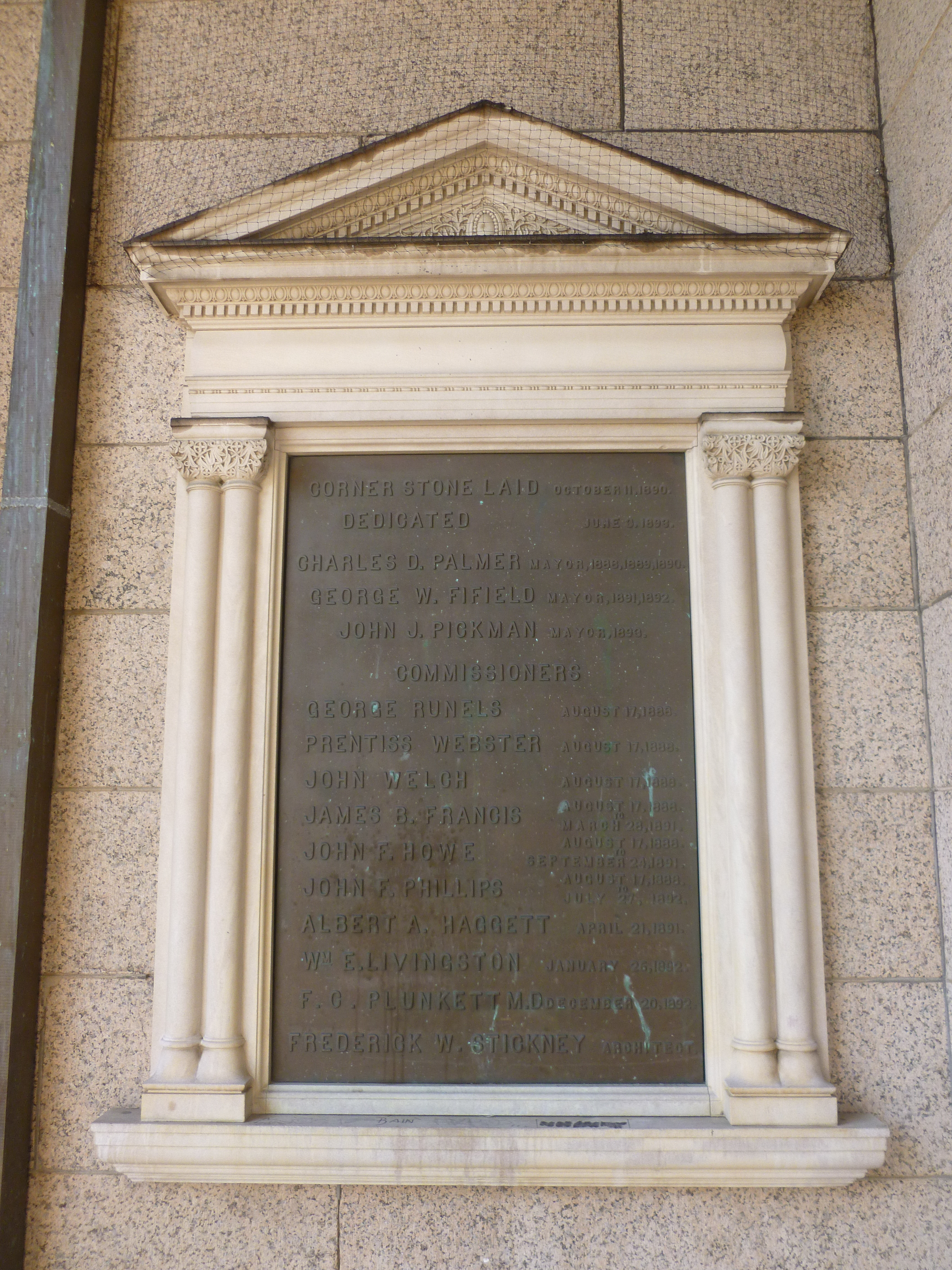
Dedication plaque for Pollard Memorial Library; Lowell, MA; 2011-08-20

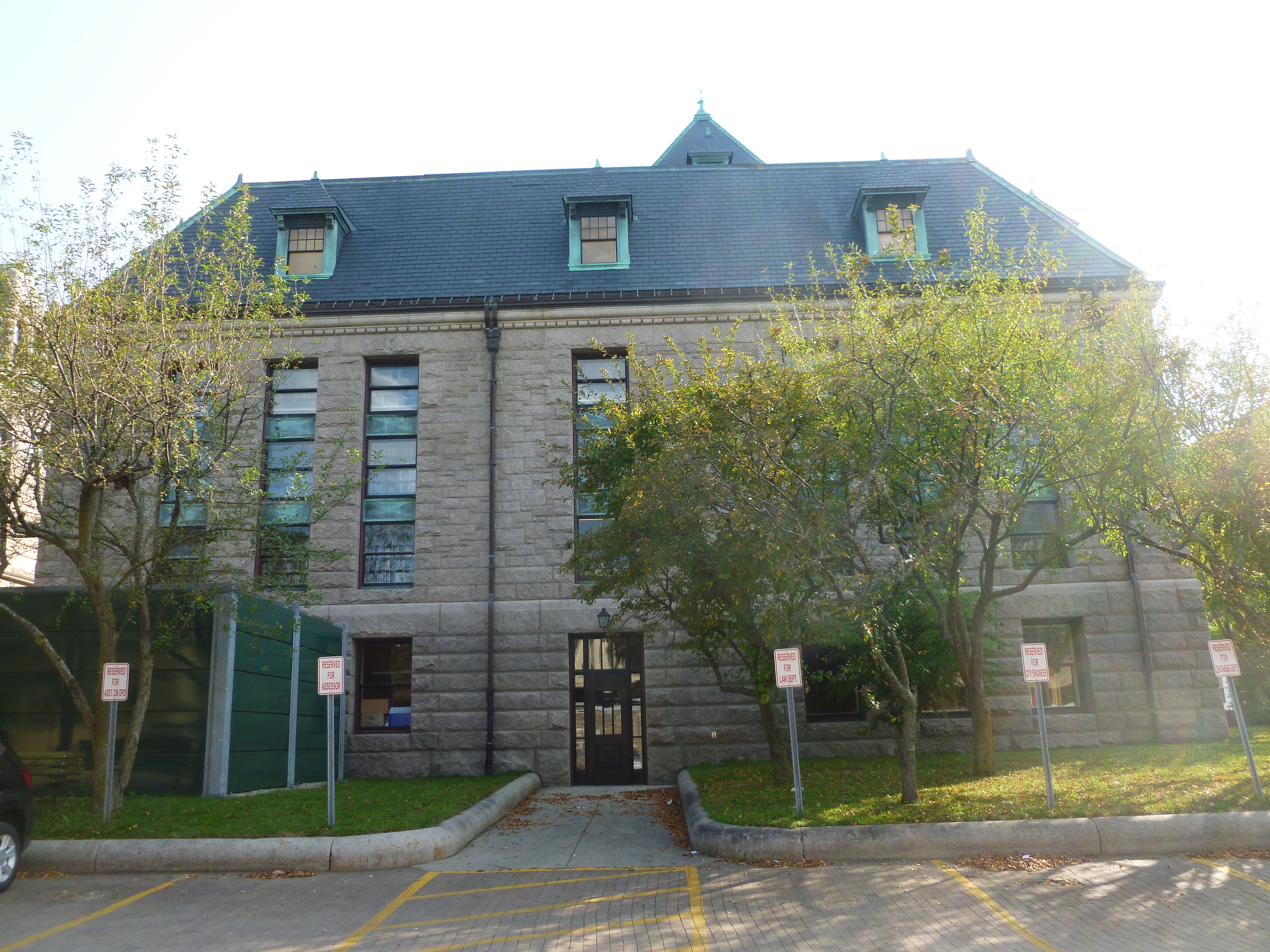
Pollard Memorial Library; Lowell, MA; north (back) side; 2011-08-20

In the mid-2000s the century-old National Historic building underwent a major $8.5m renovation.[85] The city also, recently expanded the library system to include the Senior Center Branch, located in the City of Lowell Senior Center.

In fiscal year 2008, the city of Lowell spent 0.36% ($975,845) of its budget on its public libraries, which houses 236,000 volumes, and is a part of the Merrimack Valley Library Consortium. Currently, circulation of materials averages around 250,000 annually, with approximately one-third deriving from the children's collection.[83][87] In fiscal year 2009, Lowell spent 0.35% ($885,377) of its budget on the library—some $8 per person. As of 2012, the Pollard Library arranges access for its patrons to databases owned by: EBSCO Industries; Gale, of Cengage Learning, Inc.; Heritage Archives, Inc.; New England Historic Genealogical Society; OverDrive, Inc.; ProQuest; and World Trade Press.

In 2012 the library unveiled a collection of art discovered in the library and restored by local resident Peter Kostoulakos. Items included Brook in the Snow by Rockport landscape painter Aldro T. Hibbard and a portrait of library architect Frederick Stickney.

=== Art and artifacts collection ===
- Venezia by David Neal (local artist from 1883 to 1915) located on the ground floor of the building.
- Edith Nourse Rogers Proclamation located on the ground floor of the building.
- The Art of Painting and The Textile Industry by Vesper Lincoln George located on the first floor.
- Copy of Washington at Dorchester Heights by Samuel P. Howes (local artist and student of Gilbert Stuart who painted the original)located on the first floor.
- Daniel Webster by Thomas Bayley Lawson (local artist and founder of the Lowell Art Association in 1878) located on the first floor.
- Various Audubon prints from the Lockwood edition of Birds of America located on the first floor.
- Samuel S. Pollard by Helen F. Dube located on the first floor.
- Elizabeth Sterns Davis and John Davis by Edward C. Tarbell located on the first floor.
- Frederick W. Stickney by Ernest L. Ipsen located on the first floor.
- Imari Vase attributed to Kanzo located on the first floor.
- Abraham Lincoln by Samuel P. Howes located on the second floor.
- Daniel Webster by Thomas Bayley Lawson located on the second floor.
- Brook in the Snow by Aldro T. Hibbard located on the second floor.
- Harriet Farley by Marisha Guttman located on the second floor.
- Battle of Shiloh, Lee's Surrender at Appomattox, and Siege of Fort Donelson by Paul Philippoteaux located in Memorial Hall.
- Various Terra Cotta Friezes by Henry F. Plasschaert located on the Merrimack St. exterior of the building.

== Controversies ==
In 2011 Diane Cloutier, a Library Assistant, accused city officials and other library employees of harassment. Cloutier was a vocal supporter of improving safety at the library. In February 2012, Cloutier filed a discrimination complaint for creating a hostile work environment. In March 2013 it was revealed that money was missing from the Friends of the Library account. The inquiry was promoted by the resignation and withdrawal from the State of Massachusetts retirement system of library assistant Donna Deuso. Deuso denied any involvement and accused library officials of harassing her for her friendship with Cloutier. Deuso went on to file a discrimination complaint against the library in November 2013. Cloutier was told to leave the library on October 29, 2013—Cloutier claimed it was termination, the City of Lowell claimed it she was told to leave temporarily for disability reasons. In December 2013, she filed a second discrimination complaint; this one in regards to her alleged termination. In August 2014, The Lowell Sun reported that Cloutier was accusing the City of Lowell for invasion of privacy after the city's private investigator filmed her and her mother at their home. Cloutier eventually brought her claims to federal court. Most of her claims were dismissed by a federal judge, and in March 2018 a jury rejected her remaining claims.

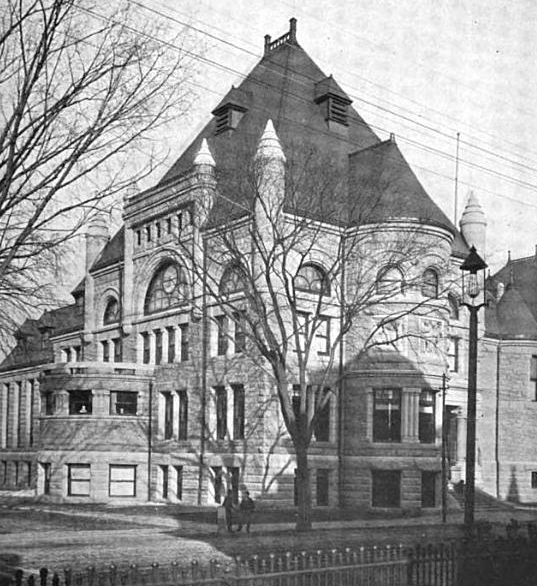
1899 Picture of Pollard Memorial Library

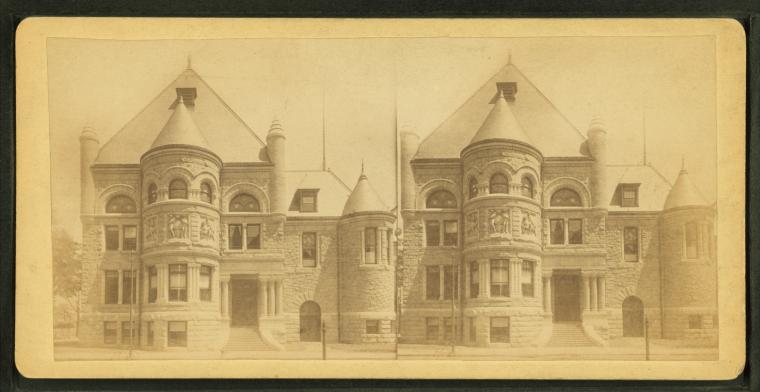
stereoscopic view of Pollard Memorial Library by L.O. Churchill
