= Rosemary Lodge =

Historic house in New York, United States

- U.S. National Register of Historic Places
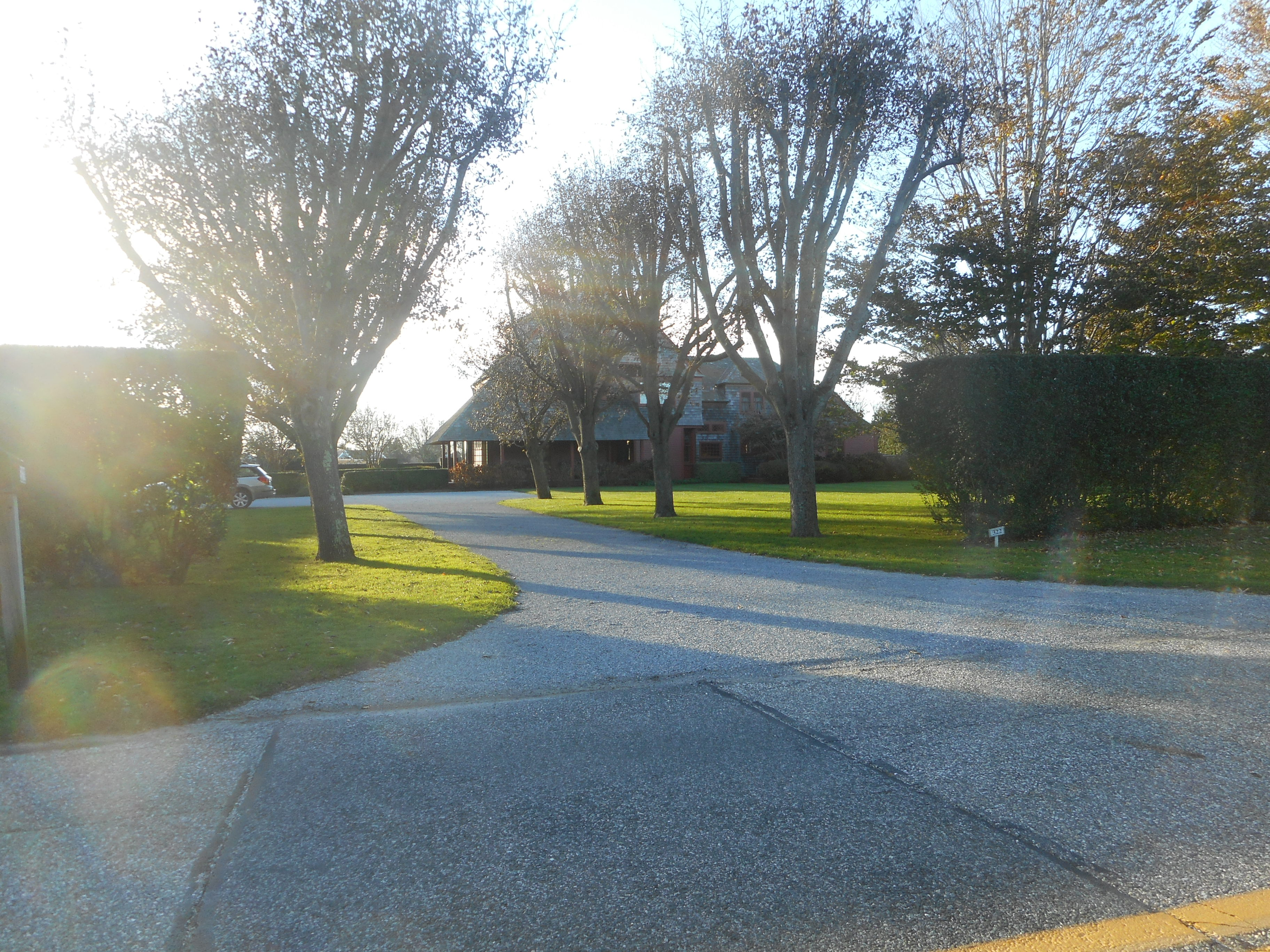
- The Rosemary Lodge as seen in November 2017.

- Location within New York Location within the United States
- Location: 322 Rose Hill Rd., Water Mill, New York, U.S.
- Coordinates: 40°54′43″N 72°23′14″W
- Area: less than one acre
- Built: 1884 (142 years ago)
- Architect: Stickney, Frederick W.; Rose, Rev. H.T.
- Architectural style: Shingle style
- NRHP reference No.: 99001681
- Added to NRHP: January 14, 2000 (26 years ago)

Rosemary Lodge is a historic home located at Water Mill in Suffolk County, New York.

== Description ==
It is a 2 1/2-story frame shingle-style house constructed in 1884 as an unfinished shell from plans prepared by architect Frederick W. Stickney. The rear wing was added in 1904. The house features a steep gable roof, broad porch, several upper-story projections, and asymmetrical massing.

The house was moved to its present site in 1985.

It was added to the National Register of Historic Places in 2000.
