= University Club (Rochester, New York) =

- U.S. National Register of Historic Places
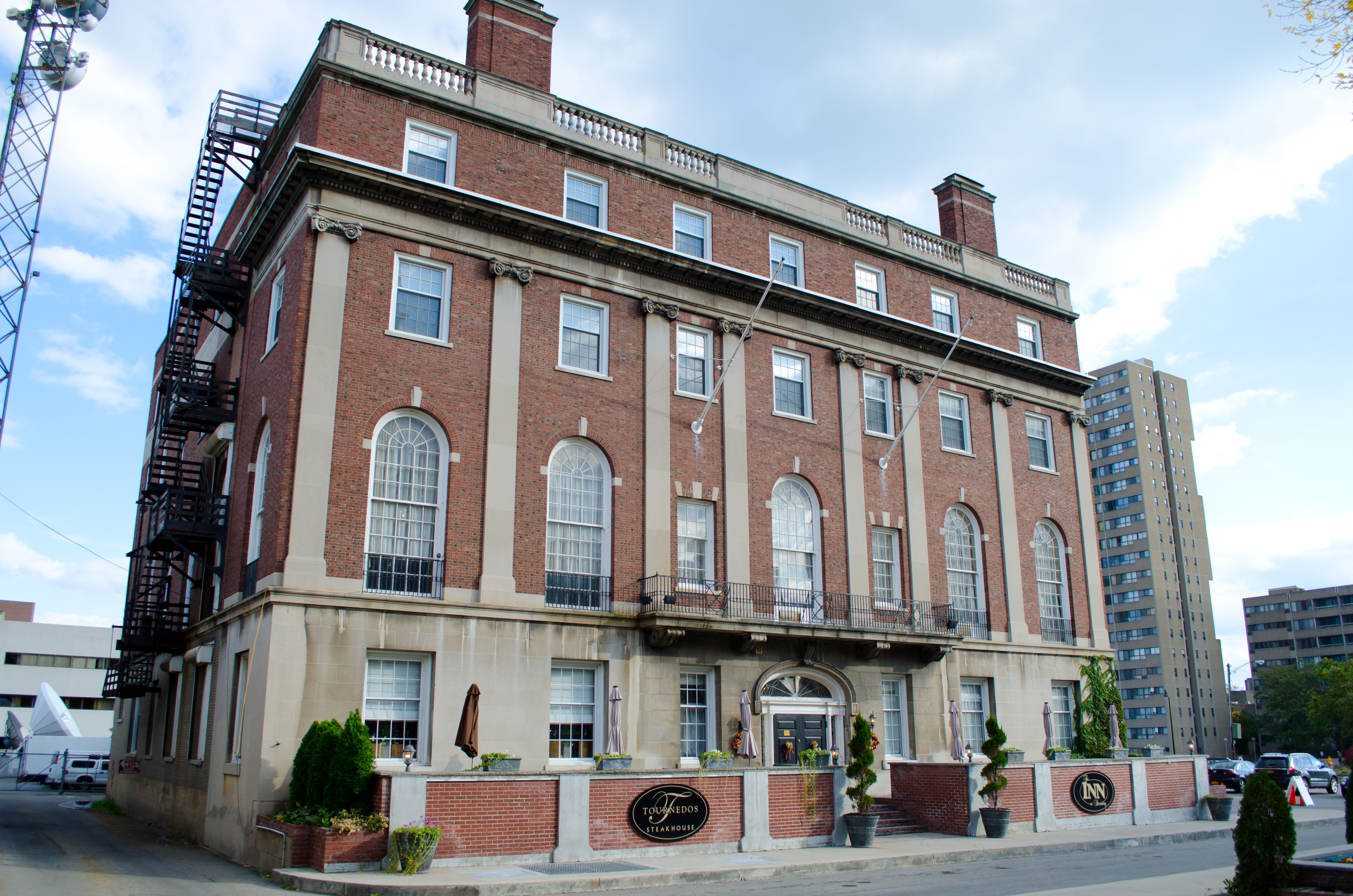
- University Club, October 2012

- Location within New York Location within the United States
- Location: 26 Broadway, Rochester, New York
- Coordinates: 43°9′20″N 77°36′0″W
- Area: less than one acre
- Built: 1930; 96 years ago
- Architect: Stern, Leon
- Architectural style: Colonial Revival, Georgian Revival
- MPS: Inner Loop MRA
- NRHP reference No.: 85002851
- Added to NRHP: October 04, 1985

University Club is a historic club building located at Rochester in Monroe County, New York. It was constructed in 1930 and is a four-story, rectangular brick structure with a seven bay Georgian Revival style facade.

It was listed on the National Register of Historic Places in 1985.
