= Yorick Club =

The Yorick Club was a private social club in Lowell, Massachusetts founded by twenty prominent young men in February 1882. The club went bankrupt in 1979 and was dissolved; its former clubhouse is now Cobblestones Bar & Restaurant.

== Inception and club history ==
The first meeting to organize "a young men's social club" was held at the home of Joseph A. Nesmith on November 11, 1882. The next few meetings were held between Nesmith's home and the home of George R. Richardson until the group rented a room at the Wyman's Exchange building.

At that time, the first elected officials Included:

- Percy Parker, President
- Frederick W. Stickney Architect, Secretary
- Frederick A. Chase, Treasurer
- George R. Richardson, Director
- Walter M. Lancaster, Director

Other members included Joseph & James Nesmith, George S. Motley, Theodore E. Parker Jr., Walter U. Lawson, Paul Butler, Samuel E. Stott, Charles H. Hooke, Harry V. Huse, Edward Ellingwood, Herbert P. Jefferson, Fred C. Church, Gerard Bement, Harry A. Brown, and Frank W. Howe.

On May 19, 1883, the club officially became the "Yorick Gentlemen's Club". Through 1885, the club rented spaces in the Hildreth and Post Office Buildings. The club then took over a suite of rooms in the Mansur Building.

In June 1900, a fire forced the club to relocate to the not-yet-named Yorick Building.

== Clubhouse ==
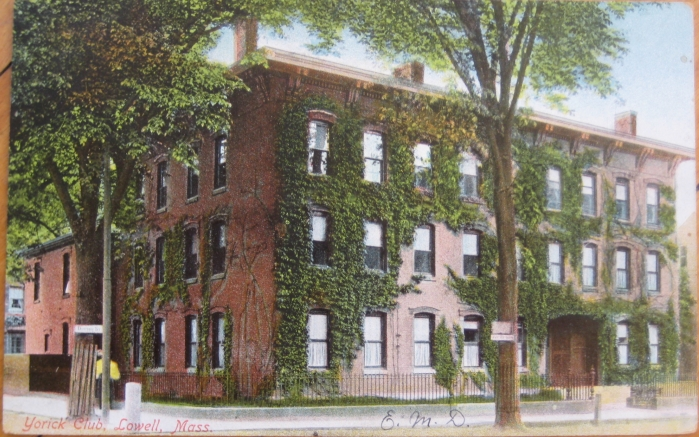
The Yorick Club in Lowell, Massachusetts, c. 1910

On July 22, 1901, the members purchased the forty-year-old boarding house located at 91 Dutton Street. Originally, the three-story brick building served as boarding for officials of the Merrimack Manufacturing Company. After the Yorick Club took over, architect Frederick W. Stickney, Secretary of the club, designed the renovations of the building. This became the permanent home of the Yorick Club for the next 78 years, until it was dissolved in 1979.

The design of the original construction, as well as the later renovations, saved the building from "urban renewal" in the late 1960s. The building was then converted to dining facilities in 1978 and housed a variety of small restaurants. In 1994, the building was purchased by Scott and Kathy Plath and renamed Cobblestones Bar & Restaurant but retains the name of the "Yorick Building" as part of the Lowell National Historical Park

== Events and notoriety ==
Just after the opening of the new building, Mayor Charles A. R. Dimon invited Chief Sachem of the Passaconaway Tribe of the Improved Order of Red Men for lunch at the club.

In 1908, John O. Heinze, president of the Lowell Automobile Club and owner of the Heinze Electric Company, convinced the governor to allow the roads around Lowell to be used as a race track over a week around Labor Day. Backed by the Automobile Club of America, American Automobile Association, and the Lowell Automobile Club, the "Auto Carnival" was held. The Yorick Club Trophy was one of three trophy sponsored competitions alongside the Vesper Club Trophy and the Merrimack Valley Trophy.

Author Marc Scott Miller spent time during World War II at the Yorick Club. He described his experience in his book The Irony of Victory: World War II and Lowell, Massachusetts:

... A good deal of soliciting for donations to the Red Cross and other social service organizations occurred informally at the Yorick Club, Lowell's exclusive lunch club for three hundred men of respectable positions and income: mill owners, managers, a few doctors and lawyers, 'successful' businessmen. ...

Former World War II veteran Frederick F. Bobola managed the club in its later years prior to its dissolution.

== Notable members ==
- Victor Francis Jewett (b. 1881) Massachusetts House of Representatives (1912–1928)
- Charles Herbert Allen (b. 1848) U.S. Congressman 1885-1889
- Frederick W. Stickney (1854–1918), Architect
- Fred A. Buttrick (b. 1848), Banker
- Fred C. Church, Insurance man
- George W. McQuade (b. 1924) WWII vet. & Hosiery Industrialist.
- George S. Archer (b. 1916) WWII vet. & Vesper Country Club president.
- John Frederic Havey (b. 1878) Harvard Grad. & Sales.
- Ethan Allen Smith (b. 1840) Real Estate Investor.
- Freeman Manter Bill (b. 1859) Wholesale Market Investor.

== See also ==
- List of traditional gentlemen's clubs in the United States
