= The Nebraska Club =

Social club in Lincoln, Nebraska

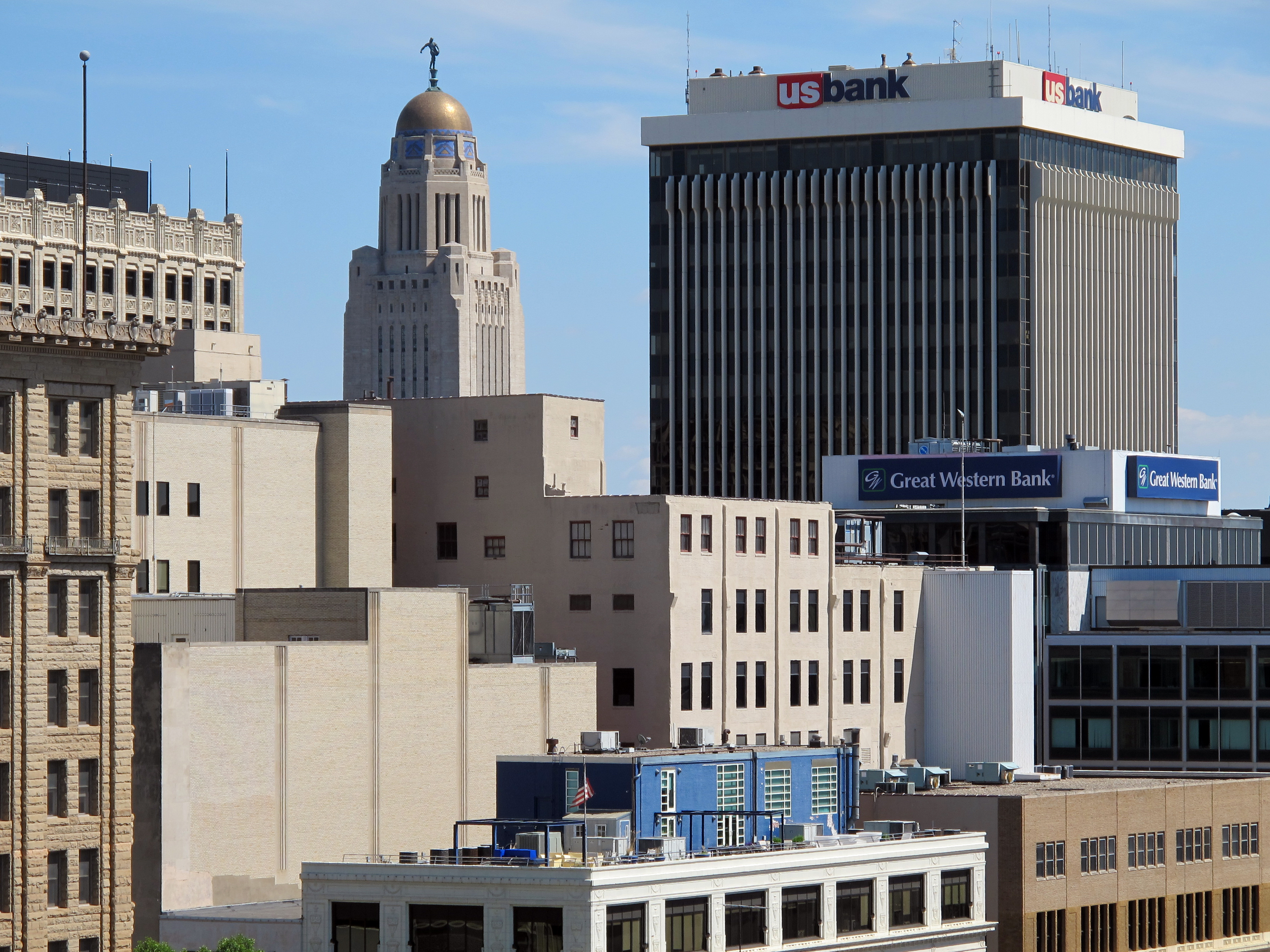
The US Bank Building, the 20th floor of which housed The Nebraska Club between 1970-2022, is visible to the right.

The Nebraska Club was a member's only social club and restaurant located in Lincoln, Nebraska. The club opened in 1954, and was first located in the basement of the former Cornhusker Hotel until 1970, when it moved to the 20th floor of First National Bank building at 233 S. 13th St. Its membership was composed of a mixture of legislators, senators and lobbyists from the nearby Capitol Building, as well as residents of the wider city area. The club closed in December 2020.

== History ==
The club opened in 1954 in the basement of the Cornhusker Hotel as the Inter-Com Club, and primarily served as an officer's club for military personnel stationed in Lincoln. At the time, Lincoln remained a mostly dry city, and private social clubs were one of the few places where residents could buy liquor by the individual drink rather than by the bottle, with the city eventually banning all alcohol sales outside such premises by 1957. The club quickly grew to include non-military members, and by its second year membership stood at over 400 members, over half of whom were civilians.

In 1970, the club relocated to the new First National Bank building at 233 S. 13th St., now commonly referred to in Lincoln as the U.S. Bank building. By 1979, the club's total membership hovered at around 1,500 members. By 2014, total membership had dropped to roughly 600 members. The club served as a gathering spot for various members of Lincoln society, including as a social, wedding and business venue. The club also served as a meeting place for groups including the Downtown Rotary Club, which had met continuously at the club since 1999, and the Executive Club.

=== Closure ===
The club closed at the end of 2020 due to financial strain caused by the COVID-19 pandemic. In a TV interview with local CBS affiliate KOLN in October 2020, Korby Gilbertson, President of the club's Board of Directors, stated that, “Our business is coming back slowly but not enough to make any money and so, obviously as fiduciaries of our members' dues and fees, we just didn't feel that it was logical to keep going." The club's lease also expired at the end of 2020. As part of the wind down of the club's operations, the lunch service was the first offering to be eliminated starting in November 2020. Special events, such as the club's Martini Mondays and reservation-only dinners on Thursdays through Saturdays, remained through its closure in December.
