= College of Journalism and Mass Communications =

Journalism school at the University of Nebraska–Lincoln

Coordinates: 40°48′55.0″N 96°41′56.3″W

- Type: Public
- Established: 1985; 41 years ago
- Parent institution: University of Nebraska–Lincoln
- Affiliations: AEJMC
- Dean: Shari Veil
- Undergraduates: 1,047 (2024)
- Location: Lincoln, Nebraska
- Campus: Urban
- Website: journalism.unl.edu

The College of Journalism and Mass Communications is the journalism school at the University of Nebraska–Lincoln in Lincoln, Nebraska. NU held its first journalism class in 1894 and formally established a school of journalism in 1923, which became a college in 1985. Shari Veil has served as the Jane T. Olson Endowed Dean since 2020.

== History ==
The University of Nebraska offered its first journalism class in 1894, taught by longtime Nebraska State Journal editor Will Owen Jones. The School of Journalism was formally established three decades later. Though they have never been officially affiliated, NU's journalism students have long been primarily responsible for administering the school's newspapers (most notably The Daily Nebraskan, which was established in 1871).

The school moved into Burnett Hall in 1948, one of the first university buildings completed after a lengthy construction freeze due to the Great Depression and World War II. Burnett Hall hosted the School of Journalism for just fifteen years, when it moved to the second iteration of Nebraska Hall on the northwestern edge of NU's City Campus.

In 1954, KUON-TV (later Nebraska Educational Telecommunications and now Nebraska Public Media) began airing, owned and operated by the University of Nebraska. The School of Journalism quickly began offering television classes, and its students have remained heavily involved in the network. A radio station, KRNU, was established in 1970 and is also operated by the college.

Neale Copple became director of the School of Journalism in 1966, ten years removed from a Pulitzer Prize nomination. Over his lengthy tenure Copple became known as the "father of Nebraska journalism," and oversaw the program through its formal transition into the College of Journalism and Mass Communication in 1985. Copple was a

In 2001, the college purchased a building formerly used by the Security Mutual Life Insurance Company of New York on the southern edge of campus, and renovated it for student use. A significant renovation of the building's aging lobby was delayed by the COVID-19 pandemic, but was completed in late 2020. The facility was dedicated in honor of Harold and Marian Andersen, alumni of the journalism school who each served as chairman of the University of Nebraska Foundation.

The college added a Sports Media and Communication program in 2017; less than a decade later, it had nearly surpassed Advertising and Public Relations as the college’s most popular undergraduate degree program. Amidst a department-wide budget shortfall in 2025, alumnus Cindy McCaffrey committed $4 million to support student workers within the journalism college.

== Programs ==
Undergraduate programs

- Advertising and Public Relations
- Broadcasting
- Journalism
- Sports Media and Communication

Graduate programs

- Integrated Media Communications
- Professional Journalism
- Public Relations and Social Media (certificate)
- Sports Promotion (certificate)

== Deans ==
In 2023, alumnus and humanitarian Jane Olson committed $2 million to establish the dean of the College of Journalism and Mass Communications as the Jane T. Olson Endowed Deanship.

No.	Dean	Tenure
1	Neale Copple	1985–1990
2	Will Norton	1990–2009
3	Gary Kebbel	2010–2012
4	Maria Marron	2014–2018
5	Shari Veil	2020–present
