= Lou, the Prophet =

1892 short story by Willa Cather

- Short story by Willa Cather
- Country: United States
- Language: English
- Genre: Short story

Publication
- Published in: The Hesperian
- Publication type: Student newspaper
- Publication date: 1892

"Lou, the Prophet" is a short story by Willa Cather. It was first published in The Hesperian in 1892.

== Plot summary ==
At twenty-two, Lou manages his own homestead. Despite working very hard, he comes upon a series of mishaps - he loses his cattle, his beloved marries a richer man, his mother dies, and his corn does not grow. He grows depressed but starts reading the Book of Revelation and takes up praying. He comes upon several Danish boys and tells them they need to pray too. They show him their secret hiding place. He then goes into town and prays in public; passers-by ask after the sheriff to stop him and he runs away into the children's hiding place. Finally he goes off down South and is never found again. It is "thought" he drowned in a river and was eaten up by quicksand, though the children believe his spirit lingers.

== Characters ==
- Lou, an immigrant from Denmark, who has been in the West for seven years. He is twenty-two. He is 'weak-headed'.
- Nelse Sorenson's daughter. Lou was supposed to marry her but she married his cousin instead because Lou's cattle died in the winter.
- Lou's mother, she dies a short time after he gets jilted by his beloved.
- several Danish boys, whom Lou confides in about God.

== Allusions to other works ==
- Lou reads The Bible, especially The Book of Revelation, and he mentions Gideon and Enoch.

== Literary significance and criticism ==
- It has been argued that Lou, the Prophet reappeared in O Pioneers!, with Crazy Ivar.
