= CEHS =

CEHS may refer to:

- Cape Elizabeth High School, Cape Elizabeth, Maine, United States
- Centennial High School (Corona, California), United States
- Centennial High School (Peoria, Arizona), United States
- Central Etobicoke High School, Etobicoke, Ontario, Canada
- Cheyenne East High School, Cheyenne, Wyoming, United States
- Clovis East High School, Clovis, California, United States
- College of Education and Human Sciences (University of Nebraska–Lincoln)
- Columbus East High School, Columbus, Indiana, United States
