= A Tale of the White Pyramid =

- Short story by Willa Cather
- Language: English
- Genre: Historical Fiction

Publication
- Published in: The Hesperian
- Publication type: Student newspaper
- Publication date: 22 December 1892

"A Tale of the White Pyramid" is a short story by Willa Cather. It was first published on 22 December 1892 in The Hesperian.

== Plot summary ==
Kakau tells about the death of Senefrau the First: his body was sealed into a sarcophagus. As a result, Kufu, the new King, is to have another pyramid built.

== Characters ==
- Kakau, son of Ramenko.
- Ramenka, a 'high priest of Phatahah.
- Rui, Kakau's uncle.
- Senefrau the First, a King, now dead.
- Kufu, the new king after Senefrau the First.

== Allusions to other works ==
- Egyptian mythology is mentioned through Osiris, Isis, and Khem.
