= The Clemency of the Court =

1893 short story by Willa Cather

- Short story by Willa Cather
- Country: United States
- Language: English
- Genre: Short story

Publication
- Published in: The Hesperian
- Publication type: Student newspaper
- Publication date: 26 October 1893

"The Clemency of the Court" is a short story by Willa Cather. It was first published on 26 October 1893 in The Hesperian.

== Title explanation ==
The title refers to Serge's being in prison for the rest of his life rather than being given the death penalty.

== Plot summary ==
Serge, a man who was brought up by a Russian woman after his mother died, kills the babushka's husband after he kills Serge's dog. Serge is then sent to a borstal. The story ends with the rationale that even though life was tough in Russia, the United States cares for their children no better.

== Characters ==
- Serge Povolitchsky, a young man whose Russian mother drowned in a pond
- Mrs Sholdi Davis, the Russian woman who cares for Serge
- Mr Davis, Sholdi's husband
- Matushka, Serge's dog
