= Mary Riepma Ross Media Arts Center =

Theater in Lincoln, Nebraska

- "The Ross"
- Interactive map of Mary Riepma Ross Media Arts Center
- Address: 313 N 13th Street; Lincoln, Nebraska
- Coordinates: 40.8166°N 96.7031°W
- Owner: University of Nebraska–Lincoln
- Capacity: 197 (main theater)

Construction
- Groundbreaking: June 2001
- Opened: January 2003

Tenant
- Hixson–Lied College of Fine and Performing Arts (2003–present)

Website
- https://theross.org/

The Mary Riepma Ross Media Arts Center (MRRMAC or the Ross) is a two-screen theater on the campus of the University of Nebraska–Lincoln in Lincoln, Nebraska. It primarily shows documentary, independent, and international films and is used for educational purposes as part of the Hixson–Lied College of Fine and Performing Arts.

== History ==
The Sheldon Museum of Art, opened in 1964 as the Sheldon Memorial Art Gallery, originally included a projection booth and auditorium used for screening and educational purposes. However, film exhibition was limited. Danny Lee Ladely, director of the University of Nebraska–Lincoln's film program, began campaigning for a more adequate media arts center in the mid-1980s. He contacted alumnus Mary Riepma Ross, a New York City attorney and longtime supporter of the Sheldon theater, who established a $3.5-million trust to support Ladely's proposed facility. Ross was passionate about bringing independent and foreign films to places they would otherwise not be shown, stating "I've always felt that Lincoln should have access to independent and art films. I've always felt they should have that access out here as part of their cultural life."

Though Ross's gift would not be received until after her death, the university borrowed money to begin construction in June 2001 on the corner of 13th and R Streets in downtown Lincoln. The center, dedicated in Ross's honor, opened in January 2003, attached to the Van Brunt Visitors Center. Ross died at age 102 in 2013, with her estate donating an additional $7.7 million to NU's performing arts school.

The Ross Center installed new seating in 2020, allowing patrons to have their name engraved on the bottom of a seat with a $250 donation.

== Facility ==
The Ross's two screens are equipped with digital projectors using Texas Instruments digital light processing technology, which Ladely believes were the first of their kind on a university campus. Both theaters are equipped with Dolby Digital EX.

The Joseph H. Cooper Theater seats 197 and primarily features American independent films, with several showings each day. The facility's second theater seats 82 and is used to show documentary and experimental films. Both occasionally show rereleases of classic films. Ladely departed after fifty years as director when his position was eliminated as part of budget cuts in 2023, but expressed interest in adding a third screen to the Ross, a microcinema which would seat approximately thirty.
