= Herbie Husker =

Mascot of the University of Nebraska–Lincoln

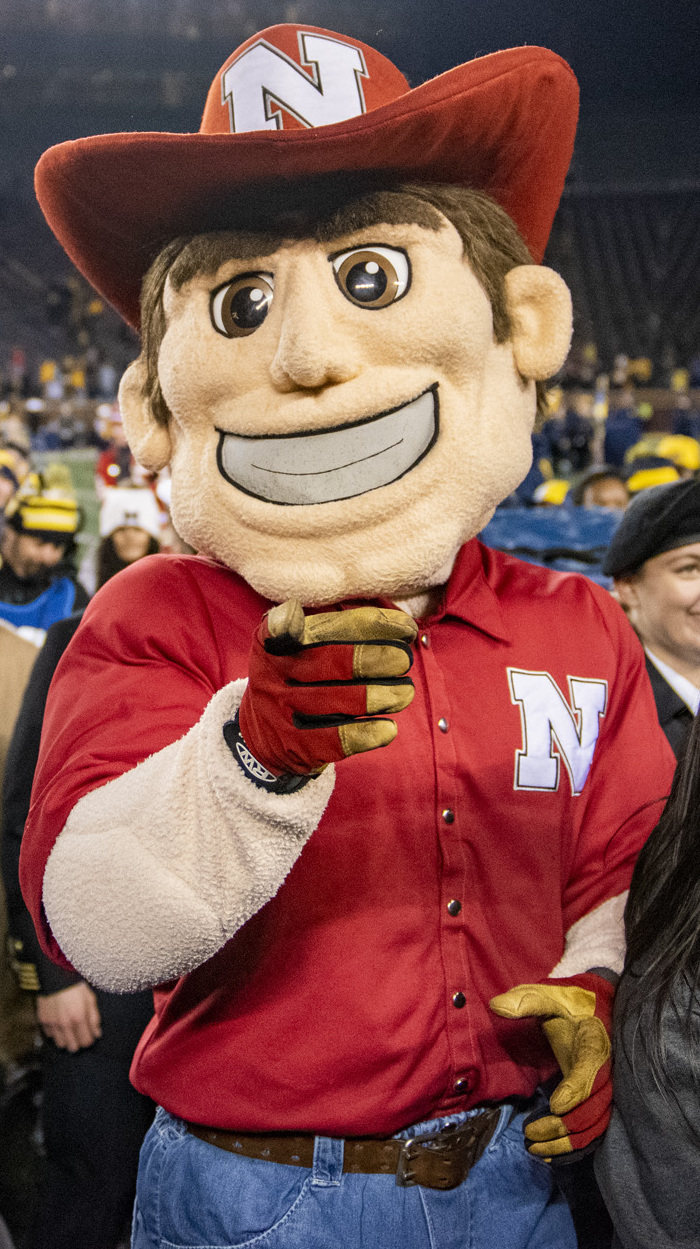
- Herbie Husker as he appeared from 2003 to 2023
- University: University of Nebraska–Lincoln
- Conference: Big Ten
- Description: Male farmer in overalls
- First seen: 1974; 51 years ago
- Related mascot(s): Lil' Red; Harry Husker
- Website: Herbie Husker

Herbie Husker is the oldest active mascot of the University of Nebraska–Lincoln and the Nebraska Cornhuskers. Herbie first appeared on the cover of a football media guide in 1974 and became the school's official mascot in 1977. Though primarily used for athletic events, Herbie also appears at academic and extracurricular events around Lincoln. He is depicted as a burly farmer wearing overalls and carrying a football, and is often seen with Lil' Red.

== Earlier mascots ==
The University of Nebraska used many unofficial mascots in its early decades, most often a variation of an anthropomorphic ear of corn named Cornhead Guy, Johnnie Husker, or Old Man Cornhusker. The earliest mascot to appear on the sideline (not just as a logo) was Corncob Man, a man in green overalls with an ear of corn for a head who debuted in 1955. Early in the 1960s the university sought a more "representative" mascot and created Husky the Husker, a ten-foot-tall farmer who wore overalls with a straw hat on top of a fiberglass head. On the orders of Bob Devaney, Husky soon gave way to Mr. Big Red (more commonly known as Harry Husker), who was developed by cartoonist Bill Goggins and first appeared in an edition of the Nebraska Farmer. Harry was nearly as tall as Husky but wore a red blazer and wide-brim cowboy hat, a tribute to Devaney's tenure as head coach at Wyoming. Harry's six-foot head could not fit on the team's traveling bus, and at seventy pounds it was so heavy that the student wearing the costume had to be switched every forty-five minutes.

== History ==
Artist Dirk West created a series of Big Eight-themed cartoons for use at the 1974 Cotton Bowl Classic between Nebraska and Texas. NU associate athletic director Don Bryant saw West's interpretation of a Cornhusker – an enormous, clumsy farmer smiling and holding a football – on a press box wall and hired him to refine it into a new mascot. He later enlisted Disney cartoonist Bob Johnson to turn West's design into a costume. "Herbie Husker" made his first appearance on the cover of Nebraska's 1974 football media guide and was adopted as the school's first official mascot in 1977. Mr. Big Red wasn't retired until 1988, but was seen infrequently while co-existing with Herbie.

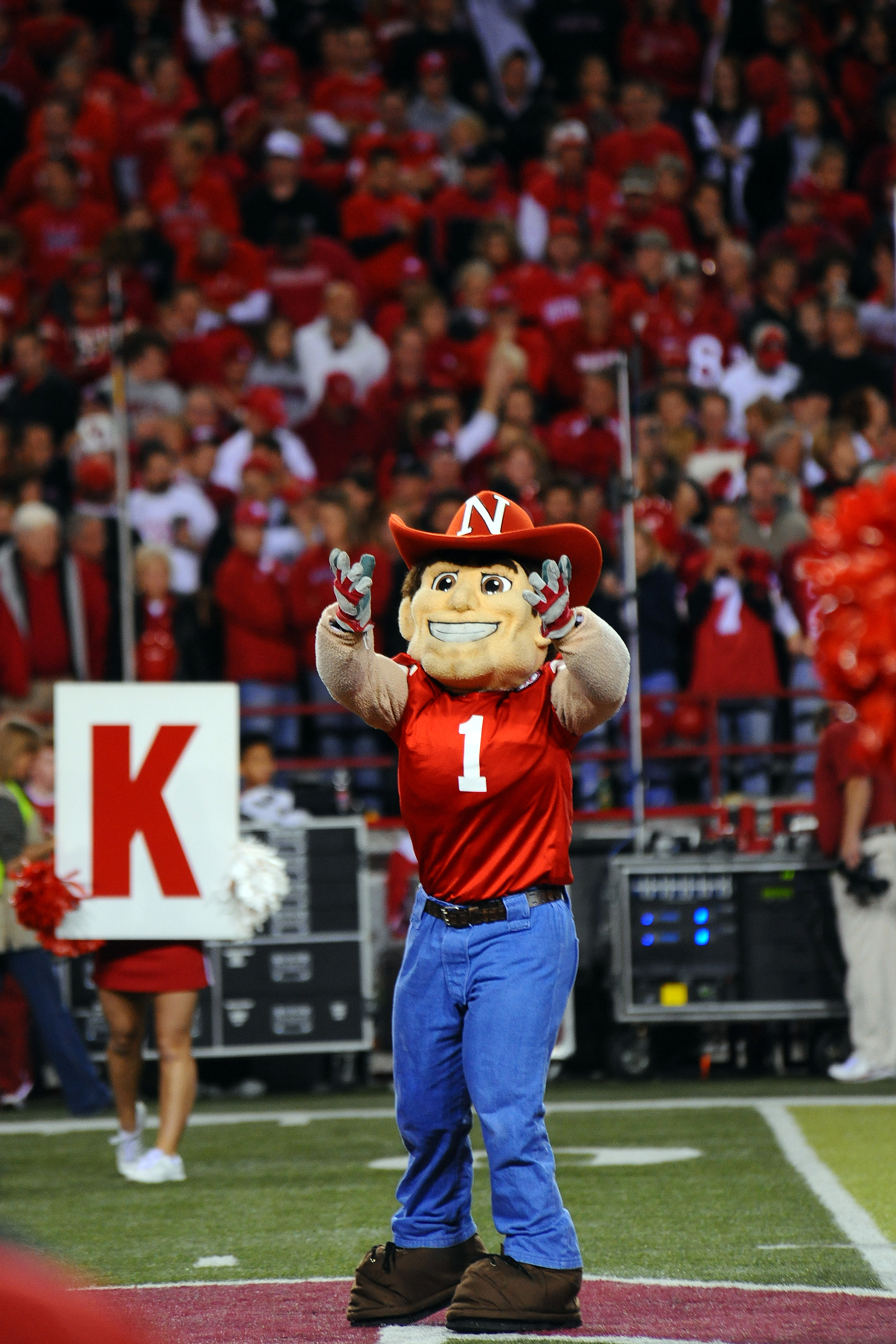
Herbie Husker at Memorial Stadium on Nov. 7, 2009

Since 1993, Herbie has often been joined by the inflatable Lil' Red, Nebraska's other official mascot. Lil' Red was created to appeal to younger fans and primarily represent the school's volleyball team, which occasionally played at the same time as its football team. Athletic director Bill Byrne ended the use of Herbie in 1995, hoping to remove any negative perception of the university while suggesting the mascot was "not nationally marketable" (Byrne also pushed to rebrand Nebraska as the "Huskers" instead of the "Cornhuskers"). Herbie was reinstated after Byrne's departure and is now used alongside Lil' Red across all sports. Nebraska says Herbie and Lil' Red are not intended to be related, but describes them as "best friends."

Nebraska holds open tryouts prior to each football season for students who wish to dress as Herbie in the upcoming academic year. Typically three to five students are selected and they are encouraged to keep their identity a secret until after graduation, though this is not a requirement. Herbie appears at all football, basketball, and volleyball games with occasional appearances at other sporting events in Lincoln.

=== Appearance ===
Herbie is a blond-haired, blue-eyed farmer with a pronounced barrel chest and a cleft chin. He dresses in denim overalls, a white undershirt, and a red cowboy hat with an ear of corn in his pocket. Nebraska used the same Herbie costume for decades after his creation, and as a result his appearance changed slightly each year as the costume aged and was repaired.

In 2003, athletic director Steve Pederson led an effort to rebrand Herbie and update the overall presentation of the state's agricultural workers and general public, just as his predecessor Byrne had done. Herbie's trimmed-down appearance, altered to include brown hair, a red work shirt, and blue jeans, was not well-received. Most of the modifications were reverted in 2023. In logo form, Herbie typically holds a football in his right arm, but various sport-specific versions exist.

In 2022, the university modified the left hand of its Herbie logo, traditionally giving an OK gesture, to avoid association with a perceived hate symbol.

== Awards and popular culture ==
Herbie starred in a children's book, Hello, Herbie Husker!, written by Aimee Aryal and published by Mascot Books in January 2005. Herbie guides the reader through Nebraska landmarks before finishing at Memorial Stadium on a football gameday.

Herbie was named the 2005 National Mascot of the year at halftime of the 2006 Capital One Bowl.
