= Lied Center for Performing Arts =

Performing arts center at the University of Nebraska–Lincoln

Coordinates: 40.816313°N 96.704563°W

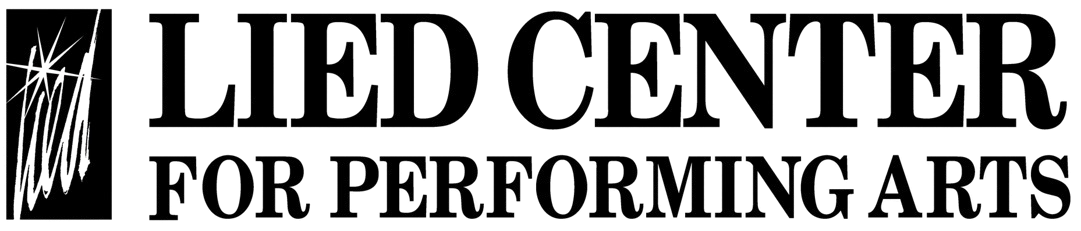

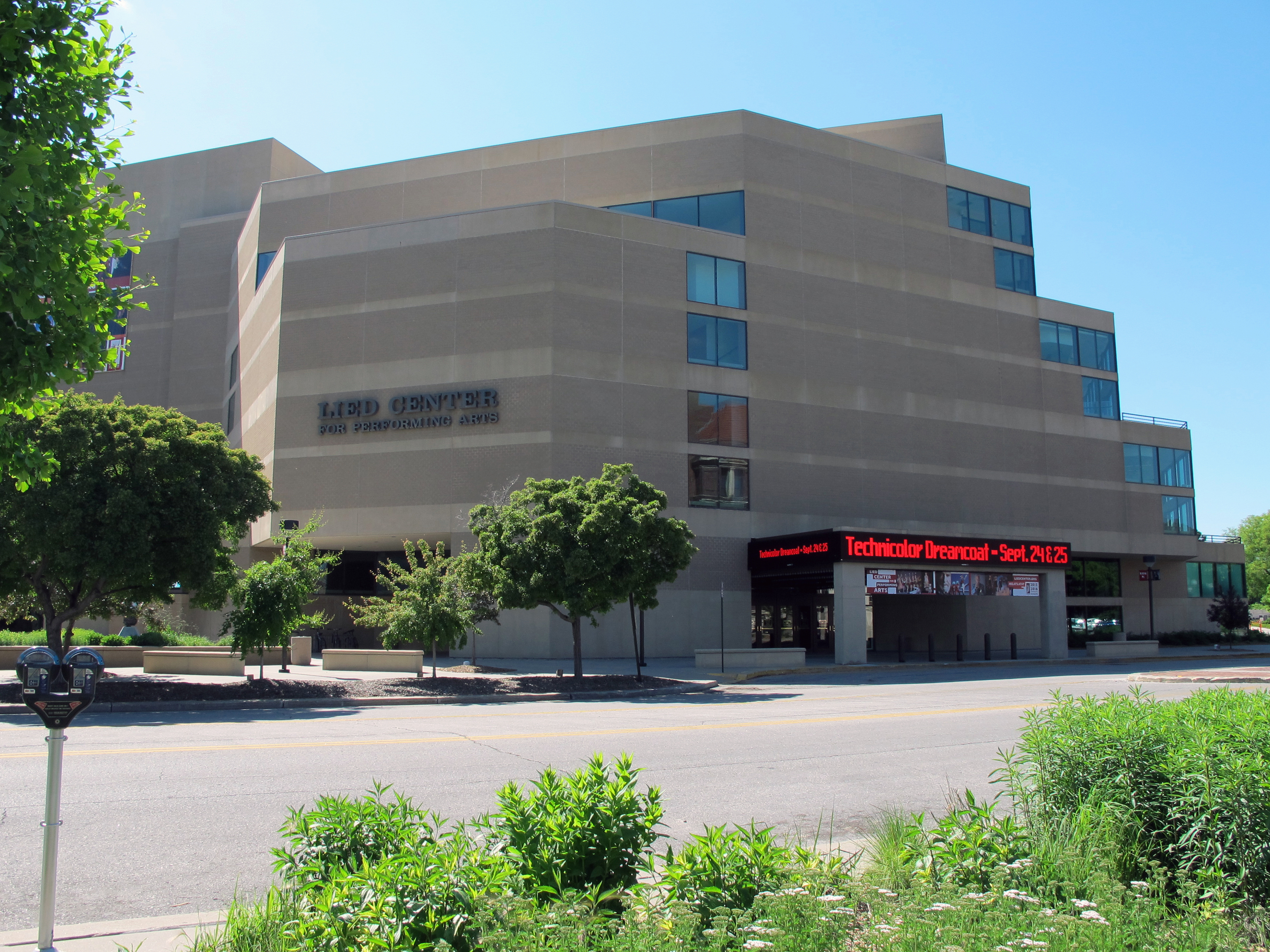
- The Lied Center in 2015
- Interactive map of Lied Center for Performing Arts
- Address: 301 N 12th Street
- Location: Lincoln, Nebraska, U. S.
- Owner: University of Nebraska–Lincoln
- Capacity: Main stage: 2,258; Carson Theater: 250
- Type: Performing arts center

Construction
- Groundbreaking: January 6, 1986
- Opened: March 17, 1990; 36 years ago
- Architects: HDR, Inc. Paul S. Veneklasen

Website
- www.liedcenter.org

The Lied Center for Performing Arts (/liːd/ LEED; frequently shortened to Lied Center or the Lied) is a multi-venue performing arts facility on the campus of the University of Nebraska–Lincoln in Lincoln, Nebraska. Opened in 1990, the main stage has a seating capacity of 2,258 and is primarily used for orchestra, theatre, and speaking events.

== History ==
Fundraising for a dedicated performing arts facility on campus at the University of Nebraska–Lincoln began in the early 1980s under the leadership of University of Nebraska Foundation president Woody Varner. Seventy-one donors contributed to the project, which also received public funding, and Varner's fundraising goal was met in 1986. Ground was broken on January 6, 1986, with demolition of previous properties on site starting later that month. Omaha-based HDR, Inc. was selected as the primary architecture firm for the project and Paul Veneklasen was used as an acoustics consultant.

Construction began on October 13, 1986 on the corner of 12th and Q Streets in downtown Lincoln, on the southwest corner of NU's City Campus. In July 1989, the university began moving offices into the building. The facility was completed in November 1989 and made its public debut that same month. Opera Omaha performed Madama Butterfly to open the facility on March 17, 1990. The center was dedicated as the Lied Center for Performing Arts in memory of Ernst and Ida Lied, whose foundation made a significant contribution to the project. The Lied Center of Kansas, opened in 1993 at the University of Kansas, is also named for the couple.

A $2.5 million commons area was completed in October 2012. In 2015, the Johnny Carson Blackbox Theater was renovated, following a $571,000 donation from the Johnny Carson Foundation.

The Lied Center saw a significant attendance decline following the height of the COVID-19 pandemic, with crowds often at twenty-five percent of capacity. The facility was largely self-sustaining prior to the pandemic, receiving approximately five percent of its revenue from the University of Nebraska–Lincoln.

In 2021, NU began a series of expansions and renovations to the Lied Center designed to expand lobby space and reduce wait times for patrons entering the facility. The $25.5-million project was mostly privately funded. At the same time, the university approved construction of a $75-million building to replace the Westbrook Music Building as the home of the Glenn Korff School of Music. In 2024, a mural of Abraham Lincoln was installed on the West side of the building.

In February 2026, it was announced that the Lied Center for Performing Arts would go under a renovation and expansion project. The expansion would include a 11,150 square feet (1,036 m^{2}) to the North of the building. Renovations are expected to be completed by 2027.

== Layout ==
The Lied Center contains three performance spaces: the Lied Center Main Stage, which seats 2,258 and is the facility's primary performance area; the Carson Theater, a black box theater named after Johnny Carson used for smaller productions; and the Lied Commons, an event space for cultural programs, education events, and private receptions. Kimball Recital Hall, located just north of the Lied Center, is also operated by the Lied Center and can seat 850 spectators.

While most performing arts venues are designed with neutral colors, the main theater at the Lied Center uses terracotta "walls" (actually acoustic mirrors) and red seats; these warmer colors "match the spirit of the people of Nebraska." The main theater has dressing rooms at stage level, a design to allow performers to get on stage faster.

== Events ==
Since its opening in 1990, the Lied Center has served as one of the primary entertainment venues in Lincoln. Among the bands, speakers, and comedians who have performed at the facility are The Moody Blues, B.B. King, Willie Nelson, "Weird Al" Yankovic, Jerry Seinfeld, Mannheim Steamroller, Bill Cosby, Foreigner, and Crosby, Stills & Nash.
