= Hixson–Lied College of Fine and Performing Arts =

Art school at the University of Nebraska-Lincoln

Coordinates: 40°48′59″N 96°42′17″W

- Type: Public
- Established: 1993; 32 years ago
- Parent institution: University of Nebraska–Lincoln
- Dean: Andy Belser
- Academic staff: 107 (2019)
- Students: 962 (2025)
- Undergraduates: 838 (2025)
- Postgraduates: 124 (2025)
- Location: Lincoln, Nebraska
- Campus: Urban
- Affiliations: AAM, NASAD, NASM
- Website: http://arts.unl.edu

The Hixson–Lied College of Fine and Performing Arts is the fine and performing arts college at the University of Nebraska–Lincoln in Lincoln, Nebraska. The college was established in 1993 as the College of Fine and Performing Arts, combining arts-focused programs from across the university. It was renamed in 2000 after receiving an $18-million donation from Christina Hixson and the Lied Foundation Trust. Most of the college's facilities are located in the southwest corner of NU's City Campus in what is sometimes referred to as the "Arts Quadrangle." Andy Belser has served as dean of the college since 2022.

The Hixson–Lied College of Fine and Performing Arts offers degree programs through the School of Art, Art History, and Graphic Design, the Glenn Korff School of Music, the Johnny Carson Center for Emerging Media Arts, and the Johnny Carson School of Theatre and Film. It is closely affiliated with the Lied Center for Performing Arts, the Nebraska Repertory Theatre, and the Sheldon Museum of Art.

== Schools ==
=== School of Art, Art History, and Graphic Design ===
The University of Nebraska established the School of Fine Arts in 1912 as part of the College of Arts and Sciences, though the university had offered degrees in the field since not long after its inception in 1869. The school was initially located in the University of Nebraska State Museum, along with the exhibits that would become the Sheldon Museum of Art. The School of Fine Arts was shut down in 1930 but reestablished in 1937 under the guidance of director Arthur Westbrook. It was renamed the School of Art, Art History, and Design in 2016 (later becoming "Graphic Design"). Richards Hall, one of the oldest buildings on NU's campus, has served as the home of the school for several decades and underwent an extensive modernization in 2000.

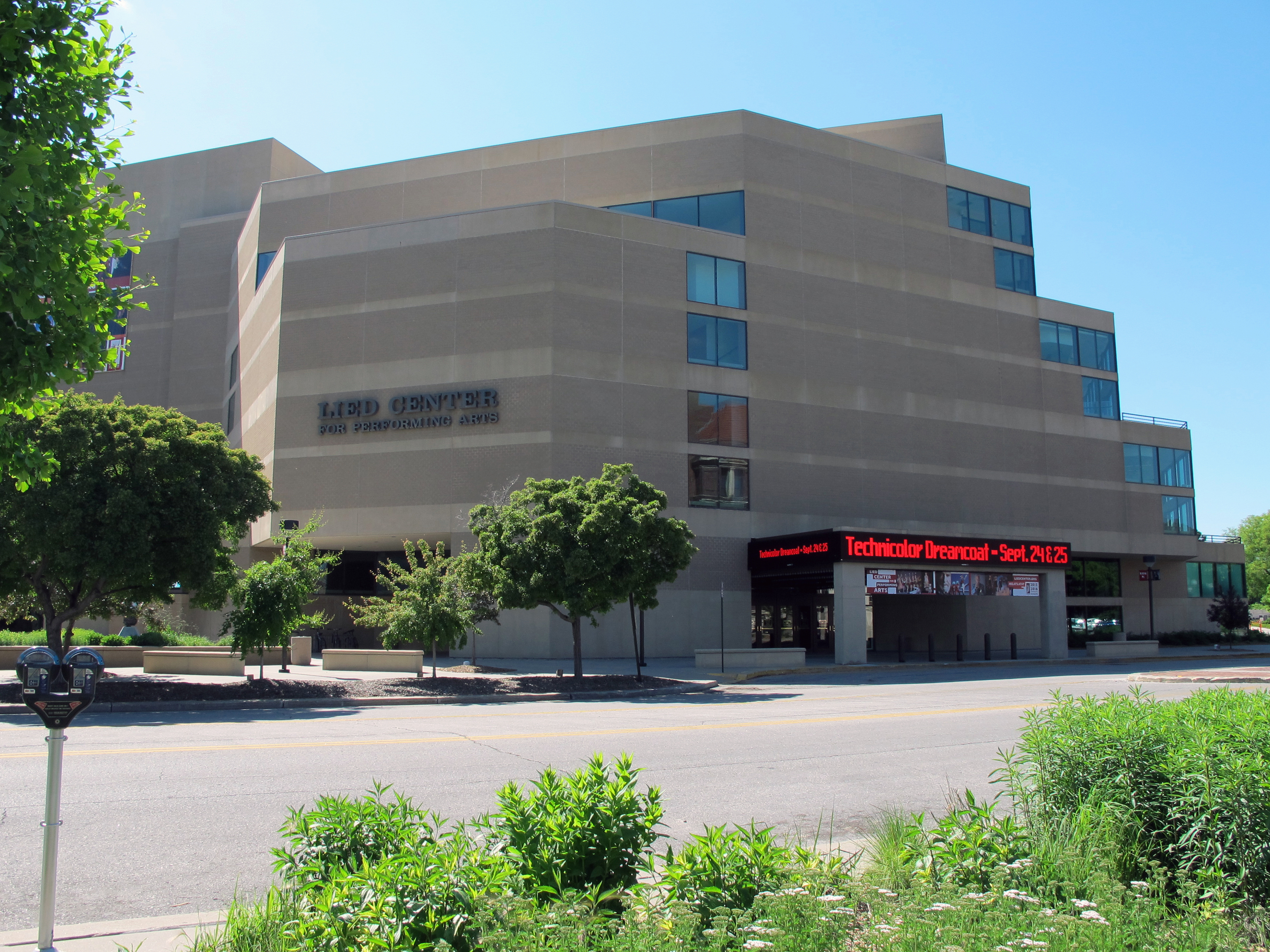
The Lied Center for Performing Arts hosts orchestra, theater, and speaking events

The school is a member of the National Association of Schools of Art and Design. Karen Blessen, recipient of the 1989 Pulitzer Prize for Explanatory Reporting, graduated from the school in 1973 with a Bachelor of Fine Arts.

=== Glenn Korff School of Music ===
In 1894, chancellor James Hulme Canfield created a music conservatory under the direction of Willard Kimball, who was hired from Iowa College (now Grinnell College). The University of Nebraska discontinued its official association with the conservatory in 1910, though Kimball operated it privately until his retirement in 1917. The school became a charter member of the National Association of Schools of Music in 1924. In 1930, the university purchased the conservatory, located just off-campus on the corner of 11th and R Streets, for $100,000 and officially established the School of Music. NU constructed a recital hall on the site of the conservatory in 1969 and named it after Willard Kimball, who died in 1939. Kimball Recital Hall remains in use and seats up to 850 patrons. The conservatory served as the headquarters for the School of Music until 1967, when the university constructed the Westbrook Music Building, named in honor of longtime School of Fine Arts director Arthur Westbrook.

The School of Music was dedicated in honor of Glenn Korff in 2013 following an eight-million dollar donation. Korff had graduated from NU in 1965 with a degree in chemistry; during his time at NU, he served as a set designer for the male musical ensemble Kosmet Klub. Korff died shortly after the school was renamed in his honor. In 2021, the University of Nebraska–Lincoln approved construction of a $75 million building to serve as the new home of the Glenn Korff School of Music.

The University of Nebraska Cornhusker Marching Band is a part of the Glenn Korff School of Music, though many of the band's members are not students in the College of Fine and Performing Arts.

=== Johnny Carson School of Theatre and Film ===
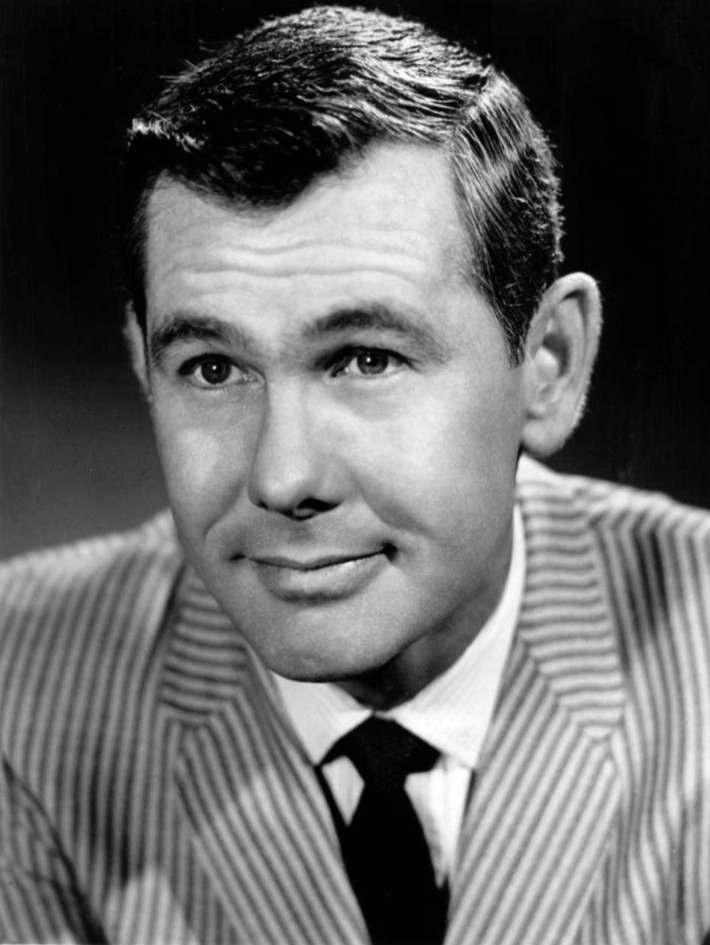
Johnny Carson and his foundation have given nearly forty million dollars to the College of Fine and Performing Arts

In the late 1890s, chancellor Elisha Andrews began fundraising for a building to house student activities at NU. Following a donation from John D. Rockefeller Jr., construction on The Temple began in 1906. It has served as the home of Nebraska's theater department since being completed in 1908.

Famed Tonight Show host Johnny Carson and the Johnny Carson Foundation have given approximately $38 million to the University of Nebraska Foundation. Carson graduated from NU in 1949 with a bachelor's degree in speech and radio; part of his contributions were used to renovate the Temple Building, where Carson got his start in radio. In recognition of his support, the university renamed the Department of Theatre Arts the Johnny Carson School of Theatre and Film in 2005.

In 2015, NU announced a further $20 million donation from the Johnny Carson Foundation, which was primarily used to establish the Johnny Carson Center for Emerging Media Arts. The new program emphasized media arts skills such as video and board game design, filmmaking, and social media. The center was constructed in the building formerly occupied by the Nebraska Bookstore, which was purchased by the university and is located on the southern edge of campus near the Mary Riepma Ross Media Arts Center.

== Affiliates ==
=== Lied Center for Performing Arts ===
The Lied Center for Performing Arts opened in 1990 and serves as the primary venue for orchestra, theater, and speaking events on Nebraska's campus. The main stage at the Lied Center has a seating capacity of 2,258, while the black box Carson Theater is used for smaller productions.

=== Sheldon Museum of Art ===
What is now the Sheldon Museum of Art began in 1888 as an on-campus art club. A museum was soon opened and was housed in the University of Nebraska State Museum until a dedicated building was completed in 1963. The building, designed by famed architect Philip Johnson, was added to the National Register of Historic Places in 2013.

The Sheldon's collection includes over 13,000 holdings of landscape and still life, American impressionism, early modernism, geometric abstraction, and abstract expressionism, as well as more than thirty sculptures. It is accredited by the American Alliance of Museums.
