= Lil' Red =

Mascot of the University of Nebraska–Lincoln

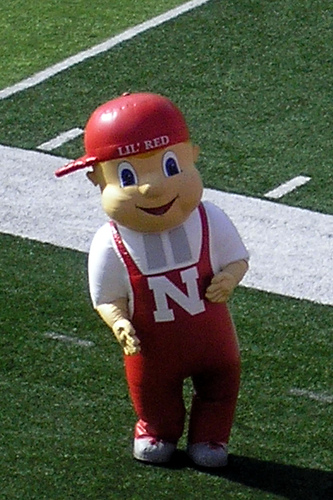
- Lil' Red in 2007
- University: University of Nebraska–Lincoln
- Conference: Big Ten
- Description: Inflatable farm boy in red overalls
- Origin of name: Contest
- First seen: 1993; 32 years ago
- Related mascot(s): Herbie Husker
- Hall of Fame: 2007
- Website: Lil' Red

Lil' Red is one of two active mascots of the University of Nebraska–Lincoln and the Nebraska Cornhuskers. Created in 1993 to represent the school's volleyball team and appeal to younger fans, he quickly became popular and his use was expanded across all sports. Lil' Red is depicted as an inflatable farm boy wearing red overalls and a sideways hat, and is often seen with Herbie Husker.

== Earlier mascots ==
The University of Nebraska used many unofficial mascots in its early decades, most often a variation of an anthropomorphic ear of corn named Cornhead Guy, Johnnie Husker, or Old Man Cornhusker. The earliest mascot to appear on the sideline (not just as a logo) was Corncob Man, a man in green overalls with an ear of corn for a head who debuted in 1955. Husky the Husker (a ten-foot-tall farmer) and Mr. Big Red (a man in a blazer commonly referred to as Harry Husker) gave way to Herbie Husker in 1974. Herbie became the school's first official mascot in 1977.

== History ==
Lil' Red was created in 1993 after a statewide contest to find a counterpart for Herbie Husker to appear during simultaneous football, basketball, or volleyball games. Associate athletic director Barbara Hibner led the contest, hoping a second, more precocious mascot would appeal to younger fans. Lil' Red quickly became so popular that the university discontinued the use of Herbie in 1995, though he was later reinstated. The mascots are now frequently seen together across all sports. Nebraska says Herbie and Lil' Red are not intended to be related, but describes them as "best friends."

The mascot is manufactured by Omaha-based Signs & Shapes International, Inc. The operator of the costume wears a belt with an attached air circulation system, which brings in over 100 cubic feet (2.8 m^{3}) of outside air per minute. Due to the outfit's incredibly light weight, the larger-than-life mascot can run, dance, shake hands, and crowd surf. Lil' Red is frequently seen bouncing on his head, a stunt that requires the wearer to maneuver the costume into an upside-down position while inside.

=== Appearance ===
Lil' Red is a blond-haired, blue-eyed inflatable farm boy who stands over eight feet tall. He dresses in red overalls and a white undershirt with a sideways baseball cap. His appearance is essentially unchanged since he was created in 1993.

== Awards and popular culture ==
Lil' Red won the national championship at the NCAA National Mascot Competition in 1999. He received the "Golden Silly String Award" as an inductee into the Mascot Hall of Fame in 2007.

Lil' Red starred in a children's book, The Legend of Lil' Red, written by Paul Rea and published by Husker Books in August 2008.
