= University of Nebraska Medical Center College of Dentistry =

Dental school in Lincoln, Nebraska, US

Coordinates: 40°49′44.8″N 96°39′48.0″W

- Type: Public
- Established: 1899; 127 years ago
- Parent institution: University of Nebraska Medical Center
- Dean: Gerry Kugel
- Faculty: 69 (2025)
- Students: 301 (2023)
- Undergraduates: 253 (2023)
- Postgraduates: 48 (2023)
- Location: Lincoln, Nebraska
- Campus: Urban
- Website: unmc.edu/dentistry/

The University of Nebraska Medical Center College of Dentistry is a dental school on East Campus of the University of Nebraska–Lincoln in Lincoln, Nebraska. The school, founded in 1899 as the Lincoln Dental College, seeks to "improve the oral health of the people of Nebraska and beyond through a humanistic approach to education, extraordinary patient care and innovative research." Gerry Kugel has served as dean since 2023.

The college is divided into five departments: Adult Restorative Dentistry, Dental Hygiene, Growth and Development, Oral Biology, and Surgical Specialties.

== History ==
The Lincoln Dental College was established in 1899, the first dental school in the state, and administered its first degree in 1901. Twenty years later, it was absorbed by the University of Nebraska and soon became the University of Nebraska College of Dentistry. The college joined the University of Nebraska Medical Center in 1979 when it was separated administratively from the Lincoln campus.

Students sold balloons at Nebraska football games for over twenty years to raise money for the Juvenile Diabetes Foundation (now Breakthrough T1D), a cause championed by longtime College of Dentistry dean Stephen Leeper.

In 2024, the school established a clinic to provide free dental care to veterans, part of what it says amounts to $6.1 million per year in free dental care to underserved populations. It provides services to over 80,000 Nebraskans every year.

== Programs and research ==
The UNMC College of Dentistry offers a Registered Dental Hygienist program, a doctorate in Dental Surgery, and postgraduate programs in Endodontics, Orthodontics, Pediatrics, Periodontics and General Practice Residency. The Department of Oral Biology participates in the Medical Sciences Interdepartmental Area Program in the Graduate College at the University of Nebraska Medical Center. Master of Science and Doctor of Philosophy degrees are offered with specialization in a variety of biomedical disciplines.

The school established the Cruzan Center for Dental Research in 1998, beginning a period that saw its extramural research funding increase sixteen-fold. It received approximately $1.2 million in extramural research funding in 2024, in addition to a similar amount received annually from the National Institutes of Health. Primary areas of research include biomaterials, bioregulation, and oral cancer.

Along with its primary educational and office spaces on East Campus of the university's flagship Lincoln school, the UNMC College of Dentistry administers two dental clinics in Omaha and a dental hygienist program in Gering.
