= Nebraska State Fair =

Annual event in Nebraska, United States

- Genre: State fair
- Dates: 11 days, ending on Labor Day
- Locations: Grand Island, Nebraska, U. S.
- Years active: 1859, 1868–1869 (Nebraska City); 1870–1871 (Brownville); 1872–1901 (rotating); 1902–2010 (Lincoln); 2011–present (Grand Island)
- Attendance: 314,844 (2024); 389,171 (1997 – record)
- Website: statefair.org

The Nebraska State Fair is the state fair of the U.S. state of Nebraska. It is held annually in Grand Island, approximately 100 miles west of the state capital of Lincoln, which hosted the fair until 2010. The fair usually runs for 11 days during September each year.

== History ==
The first Nebraska "State" Fair occurred while Nebraska was still a U.S. territory, from September 21 to 23, 1859, in Nebraska City. Another event was not held until October 7 to 9, 1868, by which time Nebraska had become a state. The fair was again held in Nebraska City in 1869, before moving to Brownville in 1870 and 1871. For the next 30 years, the fair rotated between Lincoln and Omaha. Omaha hosted the event at the Omaha Driving Park in North Omaha. In 1901, the Nebraska Legislature named the Lancaster County Fairgrounds in Lincoln as the permanent home of the Nebraska State Fair. The Omaha-based Knights of Ak-Sar-Ben was formed in an unsuccessful attempt to keep the fair in Omaha.

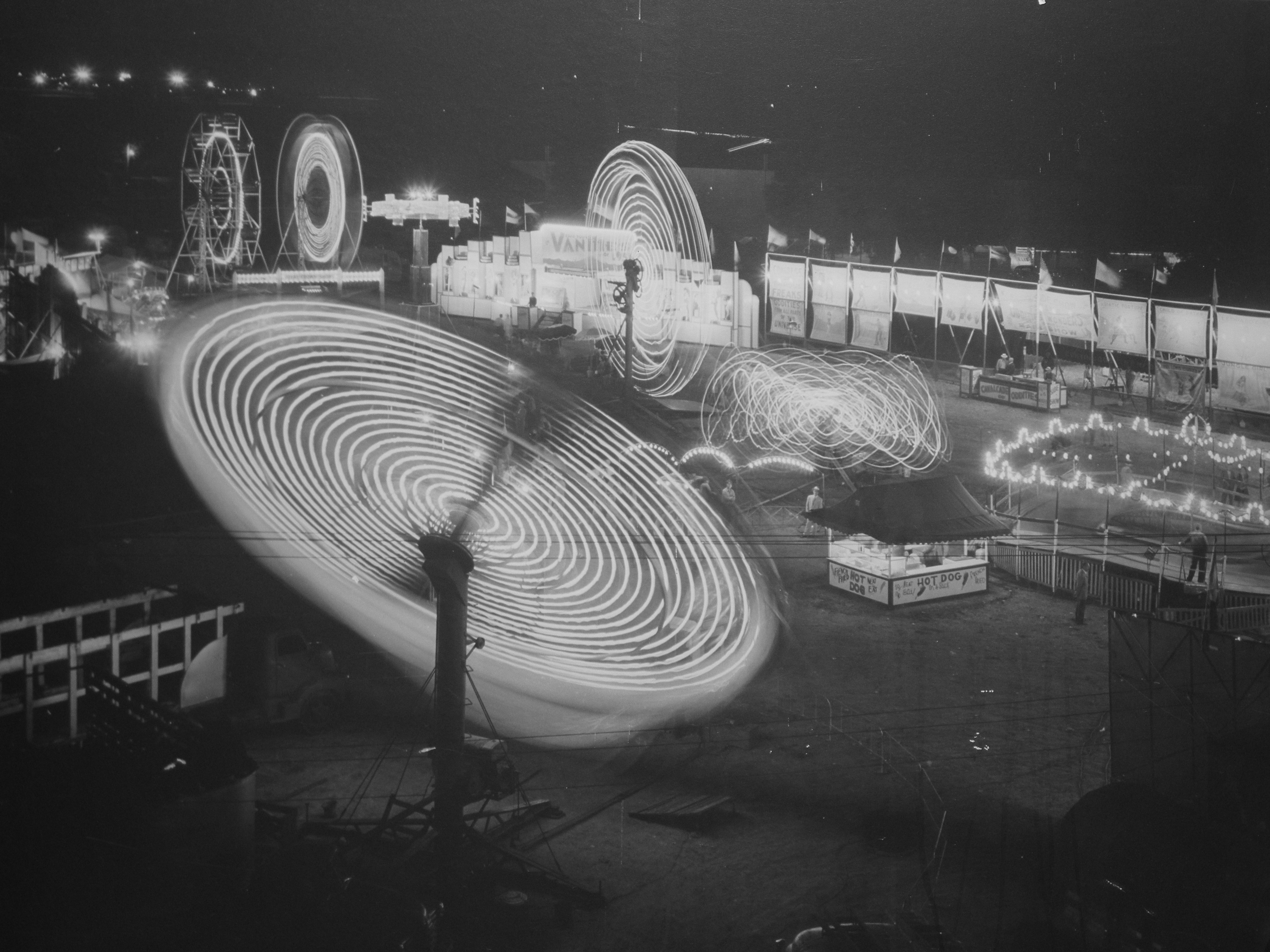
The Nebraska State Fair in 1950

The Nebraska State Fair was canceled in 1917 and 1918 because of World War I, and from 1942 to 1945 because of World War II.

Since the early 1990s, the fair has ended on Labor Day.

Low attendance threatened the survival of the fair in the early years of the 2000s. It was added as a voluntary donation recipient to Nebraska's annual state income tax and attendance rose enough in subsequent years to keep it going. In 2008, Nebraska state lawmakers passed bill LB1116, which relocated the fair to Grand Island. The bill was supported by the University of Nebraska–Lincoln, which wanted the land cleared to construct the Nebraska Innovation Campus. Several citizens filed a legal challenge to LB116, contending that it "created a special benefit" for some of the groups and people involved in the plan. However, in May 2010 the Nebraska Supreme Court rejected those arguments and upheld an earlier dismissal of the lawsuit. There was also an attempt to overturn the state law by referendum, but the petition failed to get enough signatures to qualify for the ballot.

The state allocated $42 million to construct new facilities in Grand Island, building adjacent to the city's existing county fairgrounds, arena, and horse track at Fonner Park and the Heartland Event Center.

The COVID-19 pandemic caused a number of fair events to be canceled in 2020.

== Popular culture ==
In The Wizard of Oz, the hot air balloon that transports the Wizard to the Land of Oz — and which was to take him, Dorothy, and Toto to Kansas — has "State Fair, Omaha" prominently written on it. Omaha was one of the rotating host cities of the Nebraska State Fair until 1901 (the movie is based on the 1900 book The Wonderful Wizard of Oz by L. Frank Baum).
