= College of Business (University of Nebraska–Lincoln) =

Business school at the University of Nebraska–Lincoln

- Type: Public
- Established: 1913; 113 years ago
- Parent institution: University of Nebraska–Lincoln
- Affiliations: AACSB
- Dean: Kathy Farrell
- Faculty: 130 (2025)
- Students: 4,398 (2025)
- Location: Lincoln, Nebraska
- Campus: Urban
- Website: business.unl.edu
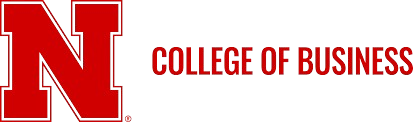

The College of Business (COB) is the business school at the University of Nebraska–Lincoln in Lincoln, Nebraska. It was founded in 1913 as the School of Commerce and became the College of Business Administration in 1919. Kathy Farrell has served as the James Jr. and Susan Stuart Endowed Dean since 2017.

The College of Business is the second-largest of nine colleges at NU and includes twelve undergraduate degree programs. It was a charter member of the Association to Advance Collegiate Schools of Business in 1916 and is accredited in business and accounting.

== History ==
The college opened as the School of Commerce in 1913 under the direction of economics professor James Edward Le Rossignol. Le Rossignol oversaw the department's transition into the College of Business Administration in 1919 and served as its first dean, establishing the Bureau of Business Research to analyze the economy of the state of Nebraska. Nebraska began offering a Master of Business Administration degree in 1964.

The CBA was primarily based in the College of Business Administration Building (formerly Social Sciences Hall) from the 1960s until 2017. When the college vacated the aging building, it was renovated to accommodate NU's Global Affairs department and renamed in honor of Louise Pound.

In 2017, the college completed construction of Howard L. Hawks Hall on the corner of Vine Street and 14th Street on NU's City Campus. The $84-million, 240,000-square foot facility was named in honor of regent Howard Hawks, who gave significantly to the university for over thirty years. The same year, "Administration" was removed from the name of the college, which became the College of Business, at the request of a Big Ten Conference advisory committee seeking to use the same nomenclature for each member school.

== Academics ==
The College of Business ranked 30th among public schools and 53rd among all schools in U.S. News & World Report's 2025 ranking of American business colleges.

=== Degree programs ===
- Undergraduate degree programs: Accountancy, Actuarial Science, Agribusiness, Business Administration, Business Analytics, Business and Law, Economics, Finance, International Business, Management, Marketing, Supply Chain Management
- Undergraduate minors: Accountancy, Actuarial Science, Business for Non-Business Majors, Business Analytics, Clifton Builders Management, Economics, Entrepreneurship, Finance, Global Leadership, Law and Business, Management, Marketing, Supply Chain Management
- Graduate degree programs: Accountancy, Actuarial Science, Business Analytics, Economics, Finance, Supply Chain Management, MBA – JD, MPA – Architecture, MPA – JD
- PhD programs: Accounting, Economics, Finance, Management, Marketing, Supply Chain and Analytics

Nebraska has offered a "study at Oxford" foreign-exchange program since 1988, allowing students to spend a month at the University of Oxford.
