= University of Nebraska–Lincoln =

Public university in Lincoln, Nebraska, US

Coordinates: 40°49′03″N 96°42′05″W

- Latin: Universitas Nebraskensis
- Former name: University of Nebraska (1869–1968)
- Motto: Literis Dedicata et Omnibus Artibus (Latin)
- Motto in English: "Dedicated to Letters and All the Arts"
- Type: Public land-grant research university
- Established: February 15, 1869; 157 years ago
- Parent institution: University of Nebraska
- Accreditation: HLC
- Academic affiliations: URA; space-grant
- Endowment: $2.72 billion (2025) (system-wide)
- Chancellor: Katherine Ankerson (interim)
- President: Jeffrey P. Gold
- Faculty: 1,840 (fall 2025)
- Students: 23,954 (fall 2025)
- Undergraduates: 19,376 (fall 2025)
- Postgraduates: 4,578 (fall 2025)
- Location: Lincoln, Nebraska, United States
- Campus: Large City, 856 acres (346 ha)
- Newspaper: The Daily Nebraskan
- Colors: Scarlet and cream
- Nickname: Cornhuskers
- Sporting affiliations: NCAA Division I FBS – Big Ten; PRC
- Mascots: Herbie Husker; Lil' Red
- Website: unl.edu

The University of Nebraska–Lincoln (Nebraska, NU, or UNL) is a public land-grant research university in Lincoln, Nebraska, United States. Chartered in 1869 by the Nebraska Legislature as part of the Morrill Act of 1862, the school was the University of Nebraska until 1968, when it absorbed the Municipal University of Omaha to form the University of Nebraska system. It is the state's oldest university and the flagship institution of the state-wide system.

The university is organized into nine colleges and offers over two hundred degree programs across its undergraduate, graduate, and doctoral programs. The school also offers programs through the University of Nebraska Omaha College of Public Affairs and Community Service, the University of Nebraska Medical Center College of Dentistry and College of Nursing, and the Peter Kiewit Institute, which is managed in partnership with the Kiewit Corporation.

Nebraska is classified among "R1: Doctoral Universities – Very high research activity". According to the National Science Foundation, Nebraska spent $320 million on research and development in 2020. Between its three campus locations (City Campus, East Campus, and Nebraska Innovation Campus) the university has over one hundred classroom buildings and research facilities. The university's enrollment in 2021 was 19,552 undergraduate students and 4,879 graduate students, with 1,595 full-time or part-time instructional faculty. Undergraduate admission to the school is considered "more selective."

Nebraska's athletic programs, known as the Cornhuskers, compete in NCAA Division I and are a member of the Big Ten Conference. NU's football team has won forty-six conference championships and claims five national championships, with an additional nine unclaimed. Twenty-five former Cornhuskers have been inducted into the College Football Hall of Fame. A total of 111 former Nebraska student-athletes have combined to win fifty-four Olympic medals, including sixteen gold medals. Among approximately 300,000 Nebraska alumni are three Nobel laureates, four Pulitzer Prize winners, one Turing Award winner, and twenty-two Rhodes Scholars.

== History ==
=== Rise to Western prominence ===
The University of Nebraska was created by an act of the Nebraska Legislature in 1869, two years after Nebraska was admitted into the Union as the thirty-seventh state. The law described the new university's aims: "The object of such institution shall be to afford to the inhabitants of the state the means of acquiring a thorough knowledge of the various branches of literature, science, and the arts." The school received an initial federal land grant of about 130,000 acres (53,000 ha) through the Morrill Act of 1862. Public opinion on the new school was split; many argued the state did not need a university as it did not even have a state-wide high school system, and others suggested any public university should be church-controlled, which was typical of eastern colleges at the time.

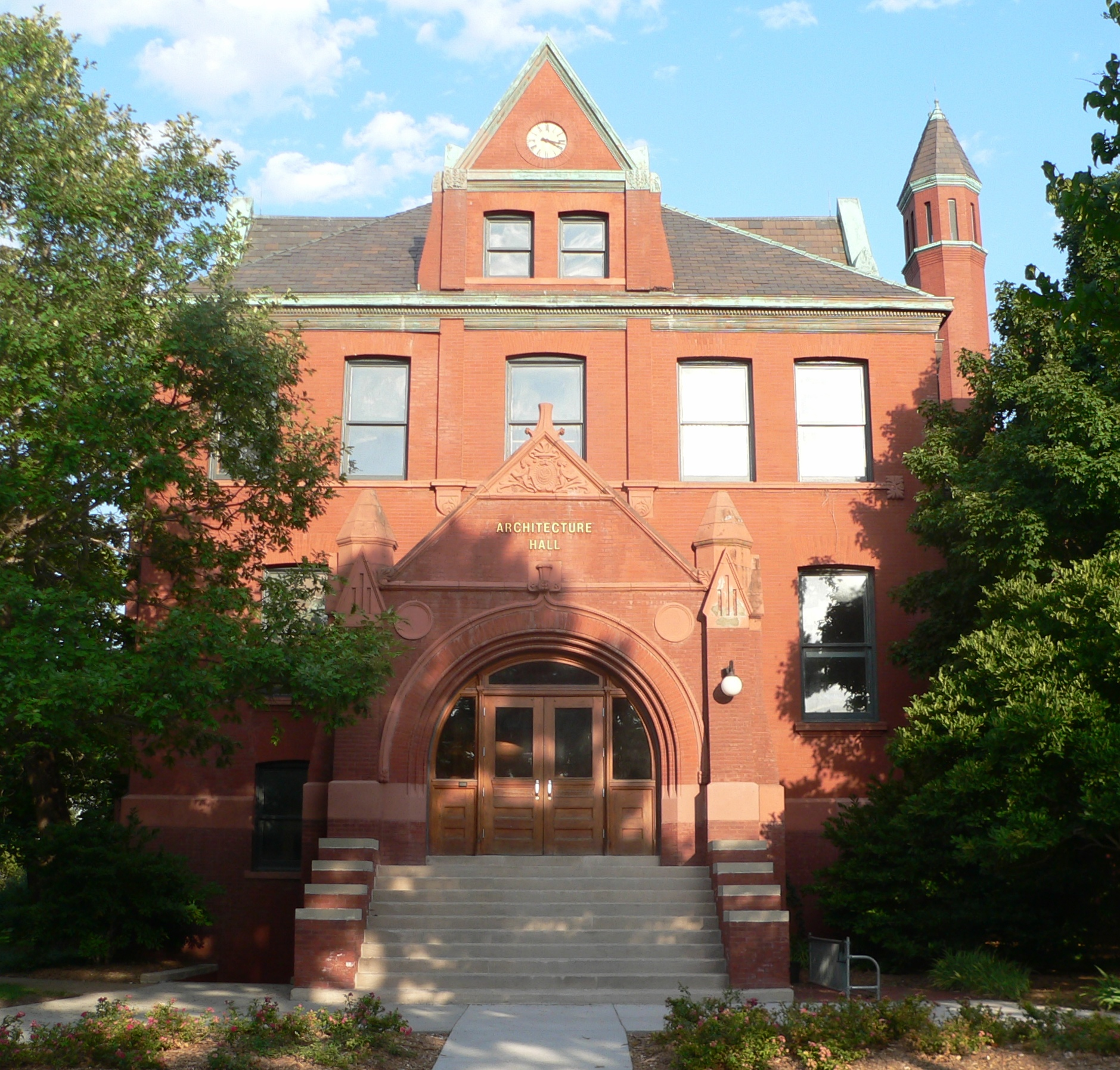
Architecture Hall, built in 1895 as University Library, is the oldest building on campus.

Campus construction began in September 1869 when the cornerstone of University Hall was laid at the corner of 11th and S Streets. Though the building was very large, expensive, and ornate, it was made of low-quality materials and required a foundation repair before hosting a single class. By 1871, the university welcomed its inaugural class of twenty collegiate students and 110 preparatory students, and in 1873 offered its first degrees to graduating students. A school newspaper, Monthly Hesperian Student (later The Hesperian, now The Daily Nebraskan), was quickly established and the University of Nebraska State Museum (now Morrill Hall) opened in University Hall. In its early years, the University of Nebraska was modest in terms of enrollment, budget, and stature. The school's development was slowed by a mid-1870s grasshopper swarm that devastated the state's economy and caused NU's first chancellor, Allen R. Benton, to resign. Benton's successor, Edmund Burke Fairfield, led a contentious tenure highlighted by clashes over the place of religion in higher education. Under Fairfield's watch, the University of Nebraska hired its first female faculty member, Ellen Smith (Smith Hall, built on campus in 1967 as a student residence hall, is named in her honor). Smith's hire highlighted the young university's relatively diverse group of students and faculty; this was done deliberately by the board of regents, which hoped to boost the school's enrollment and the city's population through immigration.

Like University Hall, many early buildings were poorly and cheaply constructed, and not until James Hulme Canfield became chancellor in 1891 were any significant infrastructure upgrades made. The forward-thinking, enthusiastic Canfield was a sharp contrast to the conservative, traditional leaders before him. He began an aggressive remodeling and expansion of many university buildings, often overseeing construction himself. Among these was University Library (now Architecture Hall), which was built in 1895 and is the oldest building on campus. Canfield worked to make the high school-to-college transition as easy as possible for Nebraskans and traversed the state tirelessly to encourage students from all backgrounds to consider higher education. By the time Canfield resigned in July 1895 to return to his native Ohio, enrollment had nearly quadrupled. Shortly after his departure the school established its College of Law and School of Agriculture.

The University of Nebraska's football program played its first game in 1890, but did not have a full-time head coach until hiring Frank Crawford in 1894. Nebraska State Journal (now Lincoln Journal Star) writer Cy Sherman began referring to the team as the Cornhuskers in 1899, and the nickname was officially adopted the following year.

=== A new century and The Great War ===
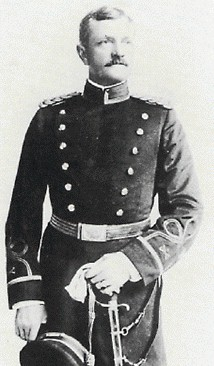
Captain John J. Pershing, c. 1902, shortly after his graduation from the University of Nebraska College of Law

As the twentieth century began, the university attempted to balance its identity as both a pragmatic, frontier establishment and an academic, intellectual institution. In addition to its football team, several noteworthy campus organizations were founded around this time, including a debate team, the school's first fraternities and sororities, and the Society of Innocents (more commonly known as the Innocents Society). Much of this new growth was attributed to the hiring of Brown University president Elisha Andrews; under his guidance Nebraska became the fifth-largest public university in the United States. Andrews ambitiously sought funding for expansion; a 1904 investment from John D. Rockefeller led to the construction of The Temple, which still stands on campus. In total, nine new buildings were constructed during his tenure, including Nebraska Field, and the school nearly doubled in enrollment. Shortly after Andrews retired due to health concerns, a fierce debate ensued over whether to keep the University of Nebraska in downtown Lincoln or to move it out of town. A relocation to the outskirts of Lincoln would allow for cheaper, quicker expansion and provide farmland for the College of Agriculture. New chancellor Samuel Avery favored this relocation, believing it would make alcohol-seeking students less likely to visit downtown Lincoln or nearby Havelock (then a separate city from Lincoln). Ultimately, a statewide vote determined the university would remain in its original location, with funding prioritized for additional buildings on the Farm Campus (now East Campus).

When the United States joined World War I in April 1917, students from Nebraska's extensive Reserve Officers' Training Corps (ROTC) program were called into service. NU's ROTC was led by John J. Pershing during his time as a professor of military science and tactics in the 1890s; during World War I, Pershing commanded the American Expeditionary Forces and became the only person to hold the rank General of the Armies of the United States during his own lifetime. (Note: The title General of the Armies was posthumously awarded to George Washington) Because of his chemical expertise, Avery was asked to join the U.S. Chemical Warfare Service in Washington, D.C., and during his absence the board of regents conducted "loyalty trials" against twelve faculty members accused of anti-American sentiment (all were exonerated of criminal activity, though a few were forced to resign for conduct detrimental to the university's reputation). Like most colleges across the United States, enrollment at NU plummeted as a result of the war. Nebraska was put in a particularly difficult position given the state and university's reliance on agriculture, which was slow to recover in the post-war years.

Many at Nebraska wished to construct an on-campus memorial dedicated to those lost in The Great War. NU built Nebraska Field in 1909, but its wooden construction and limited seating capacity meant that after less than ten years there was significant momentum toward the building of a larger steel-and-concrete stadium. The abrupt departure of highly successful head coach Ewald O. Stiehm temporarily slowed this momentum, but by the early 1920s, with "the present athletic field as inadequate now as the old one was in 1907," the university began plans to build a new stadium on the site of Nebraska Field. The new stadium project was initially conceived as a combination gymnasium-stadium-war museum complex to be called the "Nebraska Soldiers and Sailors Memorial." Due to the slow post-war economy, the scope of the project was decreased to just a football stadium (though the Nebraska Coliseum was completed three years later). When the fundraising target amount of $450,000 had been met, a groundbreaking ceremony was held on April 23, 1923. Construction was completed on the 31,000-seat stadium in just over ninety days, in time for NU's first home game of the 1923 season, a 24–0 win over Oklahoma on October 13. Memorial Stadium was dedicated the following week to honor Nebraskans who served in the American Civil War, the Spanish–American War, and World War I. Later, the dedication was expanded to honor Nebraskans who died in World War II, the Korean War, and the Vietnam War.

=== The Great Depression into World War II ===
Avery retired in 1928 and dean of agriculture Edgar A. Burnett was named chancellor. The following year, the United States plunged into the Great Depression and the Great Plains were struck by the Dust Bowl; an agriculture-dependent state, Nebraska was hit hard in the early 1930s as crop prices fell to all-time lows. By 1932, the University of Nebraska was forced to institute a five-percent cut to maintenance and a ten-percent cut to all faculty salaries, including Burnett. A lengthy, bitter fight for funding between the board of regents and Nebraska legislature lasted most of 1933, with the state initially suggesting an across-the-board budget reduction of over twenty percent, in addition to the cuts that had already been made, to prioritize funding for farmers. The board of regents desperately campaigned to alumni and voters for support in the budget fight and was ultimately able to negotiate a more modest set of cuts for the 1933 and 1934 fiscal years. A slight recovery in crop prices before the next round of university funding in 1935 meant the state was willing to raise NU's budget back to what it was early in the Depression. In response to the lack of available state funds throughout the Depression, the University of Nebraska Foundation was established in 1937 to serve as the school's primary fundraising arm.

The lack of funding, reduction in salaries, and cancellation of many university events caused a sense of general tension between administration, faculty, and students throughout most of the decade. Though he took a salary cut himself, Burnett became distrusted by the faculty, and his reputation never fully recovered. He resigned in 1938, the same year Nebraska's student union opened on the corner of 14th and R Streets.

The board of regents selected West Virginia University president Chauncey Samuel Boucher to replace Burnett. The Depression was still unfolding, and in response to a rising level of failing students at the university, Boucher instituted NU's first admission standards. At the outset of World War II in Europe, Boucher urged neutrality among students and faculty; even after the United States entered the war, he encouraged the university to "carry on" as normal. However, plummeting enrollment and intense national fervor meant the school could not stay "neutral" for long, and began offering vacant university buildings to the United States Army for training and shelter. Nebraska soon joined the Army Specialized Training Program and the campus became disorganized and chaotic as soldiers "studied very casually while in residence" before being deployed overseas. More than 13,000 soldiers received language, medical, or engineering training before the program was shut down in 1944 to allow for the opening of Love Library, which had been used as a barracks.

Many new classes and programs were offered throughout the 1940s, most of them in the medical and engineering fields. Following the end of the war, the school experienced an enormous influx of students, many of which were returning veterans seeking an education as part of the G.I. Bill, which offered them free tuition and housing assistance. The average soldier was older than the average college student, and thus the rate of drinking on campus (Nebraska remains a dry campus in principle to this day) increased significantly. Many older students were married with children, and the lack of adequate infrastructure on campus (specifically parking) culminated in a student riot in 1948. New chancellor Reuben Gustavson was understanding of the pranks and "tomfoolery" on his campus during the post-war years, and he became well-liked by the students. Gustavson was crucial to a number of post-war developments, including the integration of campus dormitories and the planning of the school's medical center (now the University of Nebraska Medical Center).

=== A new university system in transition ===
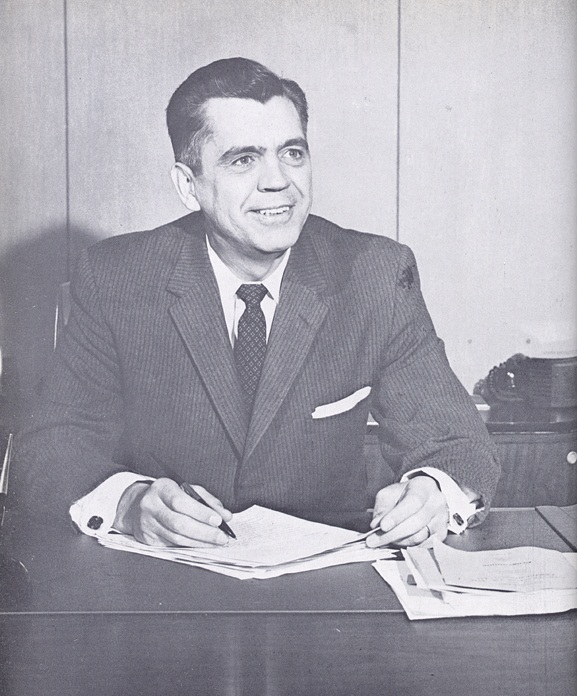
Clifford M. Hardin was chancellor from 1954 to 1968.

By the mid-1950s, the University of Nebraska's enrollment surpassed 18,000, nearly triple what it was before the war. New dormitories were constructed and the Nebraska Center for Continuing Education (now Hardin Hall) was established on Farm Campus to provide adequate living accommodations for the growing student body. Around this time, University of Chicago dean of agriculture Clifford M. Hardin was selected as Nebraska's twelfth chancellor; at thirty-eight, Hardin was the youngest university president in the country. Though not an avid fan of the sport himself, Hardin prioritized the re-establishment of Nebraska as a national football power and attempted to hire high-profile head coach Duffy Daugherty from Michigan State. Daugherty declined, but suggested Hardin contact Wyoming head coach Bob Devaney. Over the next forty years, Devaney and his successor Tom Osborne created one of college football's great dynasties, claiming five national championships between them. Hardin later said that after the Depression, he "felt the state needed something to rally around."

University television network NETV (later Nebraska Educational Telecommunications, now Nebraska Public Media) was created in 1954, broadcasting over ninety hours of programming weekly. The station proved so popular, especially among rural towns, that schools and city councils raised money to purchase three new transmitters and boost the broadcast's strength and range. The facilities for the new network were constructed on Farm Campus, which had grown considerably by the 1960s. It was home to more than just agricultural programs, including the College of Law, College of Dentistry, and Center for Hearing and Speech Disorders. To reflect this, it was renamed East Campus, given its location a mile east of the downtown campus.

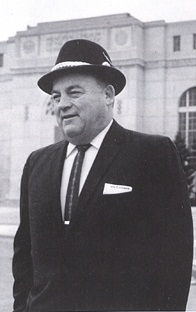
Bob Devaney, c. 1965

By the 1950s, the Municipal University of Omaha (now the University of Nebraska Omaha) was run-down and inadequately funded, threatening the existence of the school entirely. The Nebraska Legislature, faced with the prospect of its most-populous city not having a major institute of higher learning of any kind, decided to merge the Municipal University with the larger University of Nebraska to form a state-wide university system and offer the Omaha school additional budget pools to draw from. The University of Nebraska Medical Center, located in Omaha, was separated from the Lincoln school and brought under the direction of the new state-wide system. Hardin was named the first chancellor of the University of Nebraska system in 1968 (Note: Initially, the head of the University of Nebraska–Lincoln was the "president" and the head of the state-wide system was the "chancellor." These terms were swapped in August of 1971) and served for two years before being named United States Secretary of Agriculture under President Richard Nixon. During his tenure, Hardin was praised among faculty for his dedication to increasing salaries and benefits, as Nebraska faculty were among the most well-compensated in the Midwest. Just as Gustavson before him, Hardin's administration prioritized federal grant money as a way to build NU's research profile without relying on state funding.

When Hardin took control of the state-wide system, he appointed his longtime colleague Joseph Soshnik to run what had become the University of Nebraska–Lincoln. Soshnik's tenure began in the midst of a transition for the universities of Nebraska, as well as a period of turmoil across many United States campuses as students protested American involvement in the Vietnam War. At Nebraska, this included a student takeover of the ROTC building on May 4, 1970, when a crowd of nearly two thousand protesters and onlookers gathered on campus hours after the Kent State shootings. Administration responded to protests by meeting and negotiating with student leaders, and as a result, no Vietnam War protests at the University of Nebraska–Lincoln became violent or required a National Guard intervention. Student leaders later praised Soshnik and anti-war professor Paul Olson for maintaining communication and allowing students to "vent their frustrations." Minor protests were held in January 1971 when President Richard Nixon visited Lincoln to honor the school's national championship-winning football team. Nebraska won its second consecutive national title the following year, in the process defeating archrival Oklahoma 35–31 in what was dubbed "The Game of the Century".

The university completed several large-scale construction projects throughout the late 1980s. Nebraska's student recreation accommodations were among the worst in the region, and thus a new recreation center attached to the Nebraska Coliseum was funded by the University of Nebraska Foundation; it began construction in 1987 and the third and final phase was completed in 1992. The Honors Program (later expanded to include the Jeffrey S. Raikes School of Computer Science and Management) was established, and the school's first computer lab was completed in 1985 in the Selleck Quadrangle. The eight-million dollar Lied Center for Performing Arts finished construction in 1990.

=== Modern stability and move to the Big Ten ===
When longtime chancellor Martin Massengale was appointed president of the university system in 1991, the board of regents named Oregon State University provost Graham Spanier as his successor. Spanier quickly resolved Nebraska's six-million dollar budget shortfall while raising admission standards. Upon the retirement of Bob Devaney as athletic director in 1992, Spanier defied the wishes of Tom Osborne and hired Bill Byrne as Devaney's replacement. Osborne's program, however, was incredibly successful during Spanier's tenure, compiling a record of 45–4 and winning two national championships across four seasons. Shortly after the second of these championships, backup quarterback Brook Berringer was killed in a plane crash days before the NFL draft, where he was projected to be a mid-round pick. Berringer, a Nebraska native, endeared himself to fans when filling in for injured starter Tommie Frazier in 1994. The university erected a statue of Osborne and Berringer at Memorial Stadium. Osborne won another national championship in 1997, his third as a head coach, before retiring and naming longtime assistant Frank Solich his replacement. Spanier left in 1996 to become president of Pennsylvania State University, where he served until 2011 when he resigned following the Penn State child sex abuse scandal. Spanier was sentenced to two months in prison for his role in the scandal.

In 2008, the state of Nebraska voted to move the Nebraska State Fair from Lincoln, where it had been held since 1950, to Grand Island. The 249-acre (1.01 km^{2}) site was turned over to the university, which began construction of Nebraska Innovation Campus (NIC) in 2012. The goal was for one-third of the development to be operated by NU, with the remaining two-thirds privately rented; though initial progress was slow, the facility now has over forty full-time tenants.

Nebraska announced on June 11, 2010, it would end its affiliation with the Big 12 Conference and accept an invitation to join the Big Ten. It was the university's first major conference transition since joining the Missouri Valley Intercollegiate Athletic Association (later the Big Eight) in 1921. (Note: The University of Nebraska–Lincoln left the Big Eight Conference in 1996, but did so with the conference's other seven members, and in effect the move only added four new schools to form the Big 12) Shortly after joining the Big Ten, Nebraska constructed or significantly renovated most of its major athletic facilities. A $63.5-million overhaul of East Stadium added six thousand seats and thirty-eight luxury boxes to Memorial Stadium; the Bob Devaney Sports Center, primarily a basketball venue from its opening in 1976 until 2013, was outfitted for use by Nebraska's volleyball program; and Pinnacle Bank Arena was constructed in downtown Lincoln. (Note: The $179-million Pinnacle Bank Arena was completed in 2013 and is owned by a public/private partnership. The University of Nebraska–Lincoln pays six million dollars annually to rent the arena)

In 2011, Nebraska was removed as a member of the Association of American Universities, an organization of research universities of which it had been a member since 1908. Nebraska ranked near the bottom of many AAU criteria due largely to the university's extensive USDA-funded agricultural research, which was not considered by the AAU because it was not awarded by peer-reviewed grants; and because Nebraska's medical center was a separate institution whose research funding was not under the auspices of the Lincoln campus. When the Big Ten expanded in 2010, all of its schools were members, and chancellor Harvey Perlman questioned whether Nebraska would have been invited to the conference were it not an AAU member.

During Perlman's tenure, the school's research expenditures reached $284 million, an all-time high, and enrollment increased by over ten percent. However, Perlman acknowledged that many fans remember him by the failures of Nebraska's previously powerful football program, which did not win a conference title while he was chancellor. In Perlman's sixteen years, Nebraska fired four football head coaches and two athletic directors. He retired to return to teaching at the College of Law in 2016 and Ronnie D. Green was named his successor before retiring on June 30, 2023. Rodney D. Bennett assumed the chancellorship on July 1, 2023.

In November 2025, university regents approved the consolidation of the University of Nebraska Medical Center into the University of Nebraska–Lincoln. Upon its completion, the University of Nebraska Medical Center will become an in-name-only campus of the University of Nebraska–Lincoln.

Bennett resigned from his position as chancellor in January 2026, six months before his three-year contract with the university was set to expire. His decision to step down followed a vote of no confidence in his leadership from the Nebraska Faculty Senate. Following Bennett's resignation, Katherine Ankerson, a former executive vice chancellor who retired in 2024, was named interim chancellor.

== Organization and administration ==
=== Chancellor ===
The chancellor of the University of Nebraska–Lincoln is appointed by the board of regents and reports to the president of the University of Nebraska system. The position was created in 1871, shortly after the school was founded, to oversee the development of the young university. Samuel Avery was the longest-tenured of NU's twenty-one full-time chancellors. Rodney D. Bennett served as the university's most recent chancellor. Katherine Ankerson was appointed interim chancellor in January 2026.

=== Student government ===
The Nebraska student government was established in 1919 as the Student Council and a constitution was adopted four years later. This constitution was revised in 1965 and the Student Council became the Association of Students of the University of Nebraska. ASUN governs over four hundred student organizations on campus.

== Colleges ==
College	Founded
Agricultural Sciences and Natural Resources	1909
Architecture	1973
Arts and Sciences	1869
Business	1919
Education and Human Sciences	2003
Engineering	1909
Fine and Performing Arts	1993
Journalism and Mass Communications	1923
Law	1888

The university has nine colleges, combining to offer more than 150 undergraduate majors, twenty pre-professional programs, and one hundred graduate programs. NU offers additional programs at its campus from other University of Nebraska institutions, including the University of Nebraska Omaha College of Public Affairs and Community Service, the University of Nebraska Medical Center College of Dentistry and College of Nursing, and the Peter Kiewit Institute, which is managed in partnership with the Kiewit Corporation.

College of Agricultural Sciences and Natural Resources

The board of regents established the School of Agriculture in 1877 as part of the Industrial College, three years after the university was founded. Agricultural buildings were built on the outskirts of town given the lack of available farmland in downtown Lincoln, and this area came to be known as Farm Campus. The school received a boost when the Second Morrill Act was passed by the United States Congress in 1890, providing annual funds for land-grant research universities to support agricultural departments. In 1909 it was separated from the Industrial College as the College of Agriculture.

The department was renamed the College of Agriculture Sciences and Natural Resources (CASNR) in 1990. Farm Campus has since become East Campus and is no longer on the outskirts of Lincoln as the area around it has developed, but is still home to most CASNR buildings. The college maintains rural facilities across the state of Nebraska for research purposes. It offers one of eighteen PGA Golf Management degree programs in the United States.

The college is a component of the University's Institute of Agriculture and Natural Resources (IANR), as are the Agricultural Research Division (ARD), Nebraska Extension, and the ARD and Extension components of three departments in the College of Education and Human Sciences. The IANR's research, teaching, and extension education encompass the fields of food production, environmental stewardship, human nutrition, business development, and youth engagement.

College of Architecture

Nebraska offered its first architecture course in 1894 and established the Department of Architecture in 1930. The department did not become the College of Agriculture until 1973, by which time the University Library, the oldest building on campus, had become Architecture Hall. In 1987, Architecture Hall was connected to the former Law College building, significantly expanding the space available to the college.

College of Arts and Sciences

The College of Arts and Sciences, established with the university itself in 1869, is the oldest college at Nebraska. It is also the largest, offering sixty degree programs to over five thousand undergraduate students.

College of Business

Nebraska's school of commerce was founded in 1913 and became the College of Business Administration in 1919. The college was one of seventeen charter members of the Association to Advance Collegiate Schools of Business in 1916 and has since received accreditation in accounting as well. It is one of thirty-six United States business schools affiliated with the CFA Institute. In 2017, the College of Business opened Howard L. Hawks Hall, an $84 million, 240,000-square-foot facility named in honor of Omaha businessman and former NU Regent Howard Hawks. With over four thousand undergraduate students, it is NU's second-largest college.

College of Education and Human Sciences

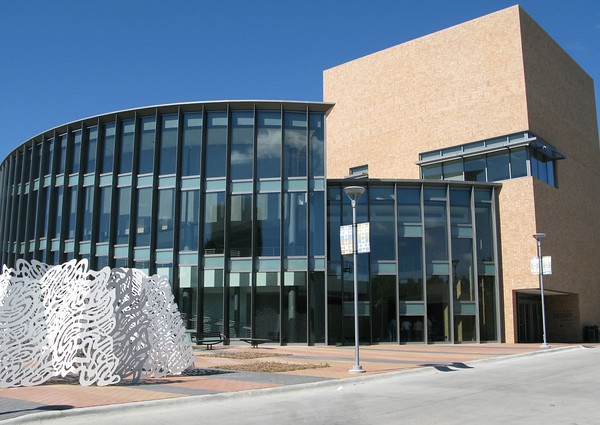
International Quilt Museum

The College of Education and Human Sciences (CEHS) was established in 2003 when the College of Human Resources and Family Sciences was merged with Teachers College. The department offers a degree in Textile History and operates the International Quilt Museum on East Campus, which houses the largest public collection of quilts in the world. In 2020, Mabel Lee Hall was demolished to clear the site for the construction of Carolyn Pope Edwards Hall; upon its completion, scheduled prior to the 2022–23 academic year, the new building will house CEHS.

College of Engineering

The Industrial College was founded in 1872 and began offering engineering classes in 1877. In 1909, it was split into the College of Engineering and the College of Agriculture. The Mechanical Arts Building (later Stout Hall) was completed in 1898 and served as the College of Engineering's primary home for nearly eighty years. What became Nebraska Hall was purchased from the Elgin National Watch Company in 1958 and NU relocated most of its engineering programs there in 1971. The college absorbed the engineering department from the University of Nebraska Omaha in 1970; though the Omaha campus has its own facilities, its degree programs, faculty, and funding come from Lincoln and its students are considered part of the Lincoln university. In 2019, the college began a $170-million expansion and remodel of most of its Lincoln facilities.

In conjunction with the Kiewit Corporation, the College of Engineering runs the Peter Kiewit Institute (PKI) in Omaha. PKI houses the original Holland Computing Center, which opened a second location in Lincoln in 2007. The college also operates the Midwest Roadside Safety Facility, which researches highway design and safety and in 2002 created the SAFER barrier for use on high-speed racetracks.

Hixson-Lied College of Fine and Performing Arts

The College of Fine and Performing Arts was established in 1993 upon the completion of the Lied Center for Performing Arts. The center, and later the college, are named for donor Christina Hixson and the Lied Foundation Trust.

College of Journalism and Mass Communications

Will Owen Jones, later the editor of the Nebraska State Journal (now Lincoln Journal Star), taught Nebraska's first journalism class in 1894. A School of Journalism was created three decades later. When the university founded NETV (now Nebraska Public Media) in 1954 and KRNU in 1970, the journalism college offered broadcasting classes for opportunities in both television and radio. The college is one of six journalism schools in the United States that participates in the Dow Jones News Fund editing internship program and one of eleven selected for the Carnegie-Knight Initiative on the Future of Journalism Education. Though The Daily Nebraskan and The DailyER are independent of the College of Journalism and Mass Communications, most of the papers' writers are journalism students.

College of Law

The Central Law College was founded as a private entity in 1888 and integrated into the University of Nebraska three years later as the Law College (now the College of Law). Roscoe Pound, one of the foremost proponents of legal realism in the United States and later the dean of Harvard Law School, led the department from 1903 to 1907. It was one of twenty-five charter members of the Association of American Law Schools and is accredited by the American Bar Association.

Graduate College

The University of Nebraska Graduate College is a school-wide program, with the same dean and administration supporting each department.

== Campus ==
The University of Nebraska–Lincoln operates three campuses, which are laid out over a combined 2,815 acres (1,139 ha).

=== City Campus ===
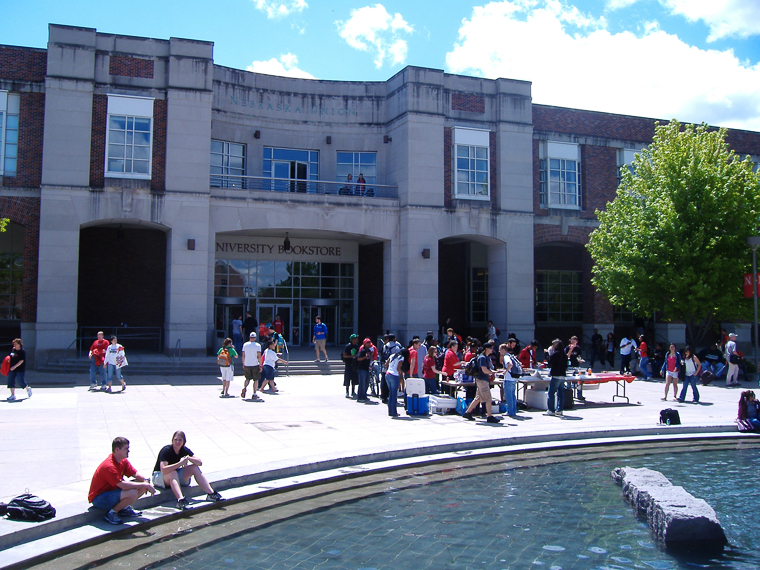
Nebraska Union

The original University of Nebraska campus was laid out on four city blocks in the northeast corner of the planned downtown Lincoln area, and for fifteen years comprised just one building, the four-story University Hall. The university used its last available allotment of original land to construct the Law College Building in 1911. The first expansion of what became known as City Campus occurred in 1908, when the school acquired land to the west to construct Nebraska Field. Further development of the surrounding area meant that Memorial Stadium, constructed on the site in 1923, had to be oriented east-to-west instead of north-to-south as Nebraska Field was. As enrollment increased following World War II, the university purchased lands owned by the Missouri Pacific Railroad to construct high-rise dormitories.

City Campus is home to the Lied Center for Performing Arts, a performing arts venue used primarily for orchestra concerts and theatre performances. The nearby Mary Riepma Ross Media Arts Center is a two-screen theater featuring primarily arthouse, independent, and documentary films. Since 1928, City Campus has been the headquarters of the National Society of Pershing Rifles, a military fraternal organization for college-level students. John J. Pershing, an 1893 law school graduate and professor of Military Science and Tactics, created "Company A," a competitive drill team, for the University of Nebraska's Cadet Corps in 1891. The team won the National Competitive Drills in 1892 and soon changed its name to the "Pershing Rifles" in honor of Pershing. The Mueller Tower, built in 1949, stands near the Pershing Rifles headquarters on 14th Street.

The school's first student union, called simply the Student Union (now the Nebraska Union), was constructed in 1938 on the corner of 14th and R Streets. It underwent extensive renovation and expansion in 1958, 1969, and 1999; a further $40-million project approved in 2019 was delayed due to the COVID-19 pandemic. The Nebraska Union houses the University Bookstore and offices for The Daily Nebraskan and The DailyER, the Association of Students of the University of Nebraska, Greek life, and the Jackie Gaughan Multicultural Center.

=== East Campus ===
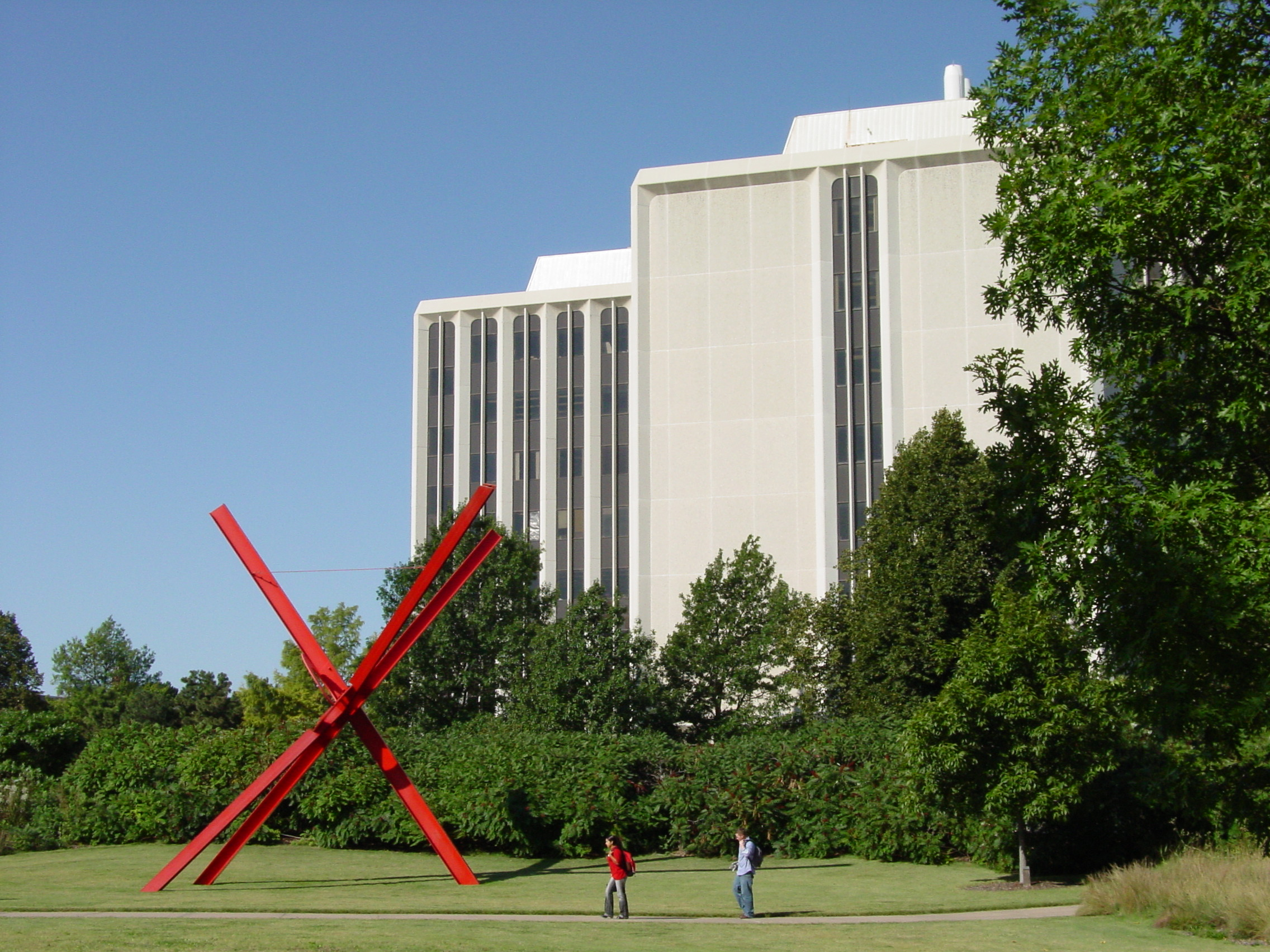
Hamilton Hall

As much of the land originally allocated to the school was unsuitable for farming, 320 acres to the east of campus was purchased in 1874. Termed Farm Campus (commonly referred to as "The Farm"), it became home to many of Nebraska's agricultural programs. At the beginning of the twentieth century, there was considerable discussion to move the entire university to Farm Campus to allow for greater expansion, and the idea was supported by faculty who felt the "wholesome environment" may be "more conducive to academic pursuits." Ultimately, a state-wide vote approved the purchase of new lands for City Campus. Farm Campus was renamed East Campus in 1964 to reflect its development past a purely agricultural development. East Campus is heavily landscaped, with the grounds functioning as a research mission of the university; they are administered as the Botanical Garden and Arboretum, which handles major plantings at both Cather Garden and Maxwell Arboretum. The headquarters of Nebraska Public Media are located on East Campus, where it was established in 1954 as NETV.

Almost immediately after the Nebraska Union opened on City Campus, there was momentum among agricultural students to do the same on Farm Campus. A temporary union was established in 1947, with a performance from student Johnny Carson at its grand opening, but a permanent building was not constructed until thirty years later. A $28.5-million renovation of the Nebraska East Union was completed in 2021. The Nebraska East Union is home to the Loft Gallery, used for community and student artwork, as well as a full-size bowling alley that is the home venue and practice facility for Nebraska's bowling team.

=== Nebraska Innovation Campus ===
The University of Nebraska–Lincoln's third campus, Nebraska Innovation Campus, was established in 2014 on the 249-acre (101 ha) former site of the Nebraska State Fair grounds, just northeast of City Campus. Plans for redevelopment included an $800-million expansion to house agricultural biotechnology and other life science research. Several historic structures formerly used for the state fair were repurposed and modernized for university use. Bordered by several athletic facilities which are technically a part of City Campus, Innovation Campus serves as a research hub for over forty public and private enterprises. As many developments are privately owned or rented, it is the only NU campus which allows alcohol. The $35-million Scarlet Hotel was opened on Innovation Campus in 2022.

== Academics ==
=== Undergraduate admissions ===
Undergraduate admissions statistics
- 2021 entering class
- Admit rate: 88.3 (▲ +13)
- Yield rate: 30.2 (▼ −27.5)

Test scores middle 50%
- SAT Total: 1100-1310 (among 8% of FTFs)
- ACT Composite: 22-28 (among 85% of FTFs)

Admission to the University of Nebraska–Lincoln is rated "more selective" by U.S. News & World Report. Among 17,775 first-year applicants for the 2021–22 academic year, Eighty-eight percent (15,701) were admitted and twenty-seven percent (4,736) enrolled. Among 2,654 transfer applicants for the 2021–22 academic year, sixty-three percent (1,675) were admitted and twenty-sixpercent (685) enrolled.

Of the 85% of enrolled freshmen in 2021 who submitted ACT scores; the middle 50 percent Composite score was between 22 and 28. Of the 8% of the incoming freshman class who submitted SAT scores; the middle 50 percent Composite scores were 1100-1310.

The University of Nebraska–Lincoln is a college-sponsor of the National Merit Scholarship Program and sponsored 37 Merit Scholarship awards in 2020. In the 2020–2021 academic year, 43 freshman students were National Merit Scholars.

Fall first-time freshman statistics
	2021	2020	2019	2018	2017	2016
Applicants	17,775	17,495	16,829	14,956	14,947	11,193
Admits	15,701	13,601	13,165	11,906	9,623	8,425
Admit rate	88.3	77.7	78.2	79.6	64.4	75.3
Enrolled	4,736	4,771	4,775	4,816	4,905	4,860
Yield rate	30.2	35.1	36.3	40.5	51.0	57.7
ACT composite* (out of 36)	22-28 (85%^{†})	22-28 (89%^{†})	22-28 (92%^{†})	22-29 (91%^{†})	22-29 (93%^{†})	22-28 (91%^{†})
SAT composite* (out of 1600)	1100-1310 (8%^{†})	1130-1310 (10%^{†})	1140-1360 (12%^{†})	1130-1360 (11%^{†})	1100-1380 (7%^{†})	—
* middle 50% range^{†} percentage of first-time freshmen who chose to submit

=== Libraries ===
Academic rankings

National
- Forbes: 191
- U.S. News & World Report: 152
- Washington Monthly: 245
- WSJ/College Pulse: 344

Global
- ARWU: 201–300
- QS: 711-720
- THE: 401–500
- U.S. News & World Report: 497

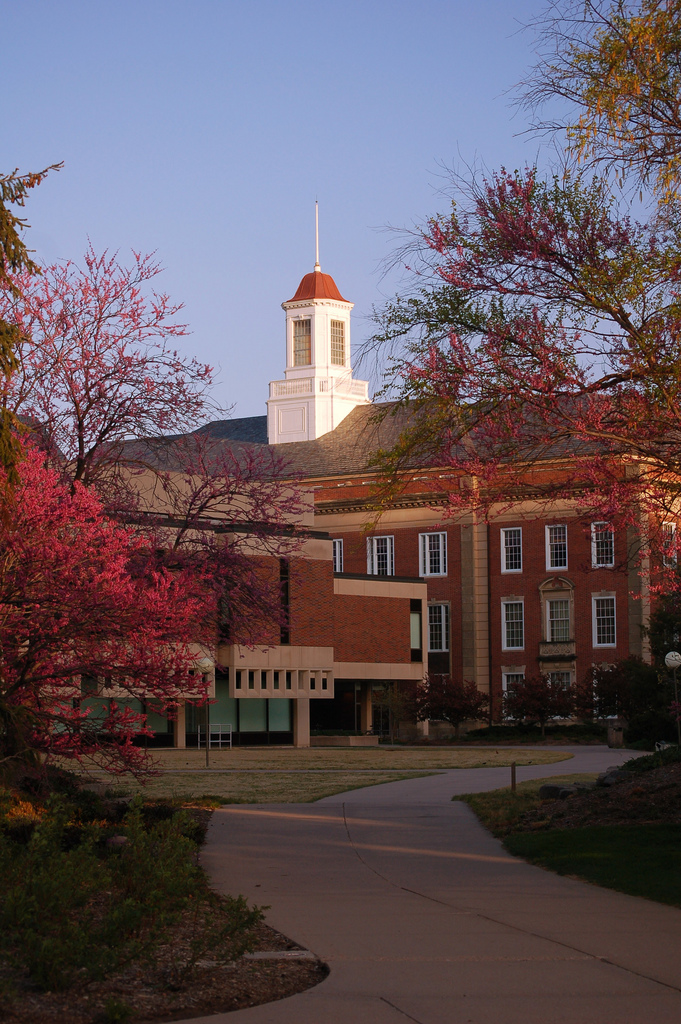
Don L. Love Memorial Library

The university dedicated University Library (now Architecture Hall) on December 10, 1895. Initially, only one of the building's four stories housed library collections, but less than twenty years after its opening the entire facility was needed. An $850,000 gift from former Lincoln mayor Don Lathrop Love facilitated the construction of Don L. Love Memorial Library, completed in 1943. The new building was initially used to house cadets in the Army Specialized Training Program during World War II before opening for university use in 1945. A significant expansion on the north side of the building was completed in 1972 and became known as Love Library North. The $10-million, 30,000-square-foot Adele Coryell Hall Learning Commons were opened in 2016 on the first floor of Love Library North.

The C. Y. Thompson Library was dedicated in 1966 on East Campus as the university's first standalone branch library; it was renamed the Dinsdale Family Learning Commons in 2022 following a significant remodel and serves the Colleges of Agricultural Sciences and Natural Resources, Dentistry, and Special Education and Communication Disorders. There are six other branch locations on campus: the Architecture Library, Engineering Library, Geology Library, Marvin and Virginia Schmid Law Library, Mathematics Library, and Music Library. The university's libraries combine to offer nearly four million volumes and are the only set of comprehensive research libraries in Nebraska.

=== Museums and galleries ===
Originally established in 1871, the University of Nebraska State Museum is located in Morrill Hall on City Campus. It houses collections and exhibits featuring natural history, including its most popular attraction, a set of Mammoth fossils. Because of these fossils and a bronze Columbian mammoth statue in front of the building named Archie, it is popularly known as "Elephant Hall." The State Museum is a member of the American Alliance of Museums and a Smithsonian affiliate.

The Sheldon Museum of Art is home to more than twelve thousand works of American visual art in all media. It has prominent holdings in nineteenth-century landscape and still life, American Impressionism, early modernism, and contemporary art. The museum has the largest collection of twentieth-century North American art in the world and houses works by artists Andy Warhol, Jackson Pollock, and Georgia O'Keeffe. The nearby Great Plains Art Museum is home to the Christlieb Collection and features American western art and Americana.

The International Quilt Museum, home to the largest public collection of quilts in the world, is located in the southwest corner of East Campus. The Lester F. Larsen Tractor Museum, established on East Campus in 1980, houses forty historical tractors, an antique auto, and various farm tools. Along with the Nebraska Tractor Test Laboratory, it documents Nebraska's tractor testing law examination that tests all tractors sold in the state to ensure performance meets advertised specifications. The Robert Hillestad Textiles Gallery, also on East Campus, features exhibitions of historic and contemporary textiles and clothing.

Other university art galleries include the Eisentrager-Howard Gallery, the Kruger Collection, and the student-run MEDICI Gallery in Richards Hall. The Lentz Center for Asian Culture is no longer open to the public, though its collection of Asian ceramics, paintings, prints, sculpture, and textiles has been digitized for online viewing.

== Athletics ==
Nebraska Cornhuskers logo

The Nebraska Cornhuskers (often abbreviated to "Huskers") are the intercollegiate athletic teams that represent the University of Nebraska–Lincoln. The university is a member of the Big Ten Conference and competes in NCAA Division I, fielding twenty-four varsity teams (ten men's, fourteen women's) in sixteen sports. After spending its early decades without an official nickname or mascot, NU officially became the "Cornhuskers" in 1900; the nickname was later adopted by the state of Nebraska itself, which became "The Cornhusker State" in 1946.

Nebraska was a founding member of the short-lived Western Interstate University Football Association in 1892 and helped form the Missouri Intercollegiate Athletic Association fifteen years later. The MVIAA, which became the Big Eight in 1964, served as Nebraska's primary conference for the next eighty-nine years, with a brief hiatus during World War I. In 1996, the Big Eight merged with four Texas schools from the Southwest Conference to form the Big 12. Nebraska joined the Big Ten in 2011, a lucrative transition that separated the school from most of its traditional rivals.

Nebraska's varsity athletic programs have won thirty-two national championships (eleven in bowling, eight in men's gymnastics, five each in football and volleyball, and three in women's track and field) and 359 combined conference regular-season and tournament championships. The Cornhuskers are commonly referred to as the "Big Red" and have two official mascots, Herbie Husker and Lil' Red.

=== Football ===
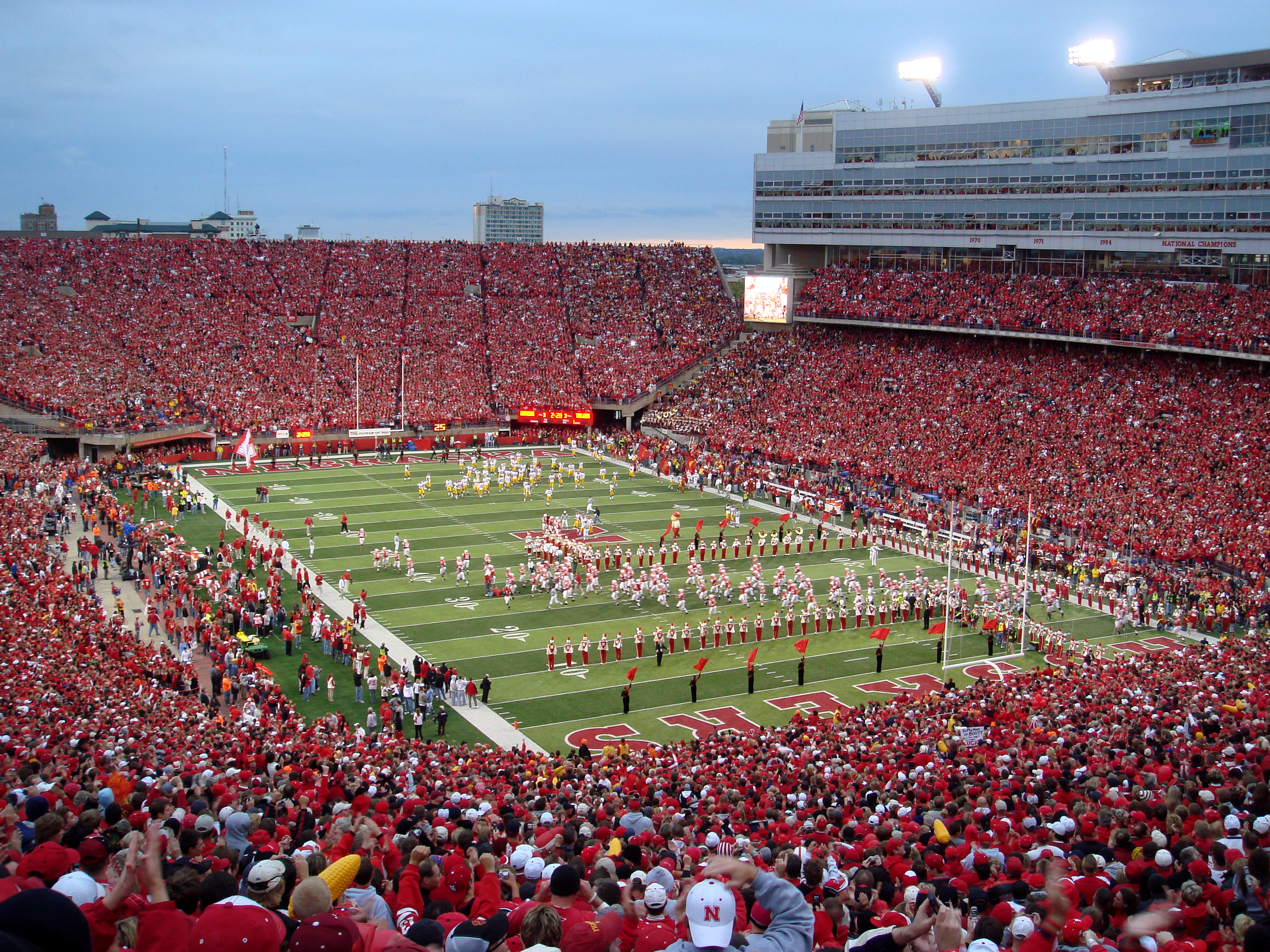
Nebraska has played at Memorial Stadium since 1923.

The Nebraska Cornhuskers football team competes in the NCAA Division I Football Bowl Subdivision. NU has played its home games at Memorial Stadium since 1923 and sold out every game at the venue since 1962.

Nebraska is among the most storied programs in college football history and has the eighth-most all-time victories among FBS teams. NU has won forty-six conference championships and five national championships, along with seven unclaimed national titles. Heisman Trophy winners Johnny Rodgers, Mike Rozier, and Eric Crouch join twenty-four other Cornhuskers in the College Football Hall of Fame.

The program's first extended period of success came early in the twentieth century. Between 1900 and 1916, Nebraska had five undefeated seasons and a stretch of thirty-four games without a loss. The Cornhuskers won twenty-four conference championships prior to World War II but struggled through the postwar years until Bob Devaney was hired in 1962. Devaney built Nebraska into a national power, winning two national championships and eight conference titles in eleven seasons as head coach. Offensive coordinator Tom Osborne was named Devaney's successor in 1973 and over the next twenty-five years established himself as one of the best coaches in college football history with his trademark I formation offense and revolutionary strength, conditioning, and nutrition programs. Following Osborne's retirement in 1997, Nebraska cycled through five head coaches before hiring Matt Rhule in 2023.

== Student life ==
=== Student body ===
Undergraduate demographics as of Fall 2023
Race and ethnicity	Total
White	76%
Hispanic	9%
Asian	4%
Two or more races	4%
Black	3%
International student	3%
Unknown	1%
Economic diversity
Low-income (Note: The percentage of students who received an income-based federal Pell grant intended for low-income students.)	22%
Affluent (Note: The percentage of students who are a part of the American middle class at the bare minimum.)	78%

Seventy-six percent of NU's undergraduates were classified as "white, non-Hispanic," 8.3 percent were Hispanic or Latino, 3.6 percent were Asian, 2.8 percent were black or African-American, and less than one percent were American Indian, native Alaskan, native Hawaiian, or Pacific Islander. Fifty-one percent of the undergraduate population was male and forty-nine percent was female.

At the outset of the 2021–22 academic year NU had 1,595 instructional faculty, of which 1,304 were full-time. Fifty-eight percent (919) were male and forty-two percent (676) were female. The school's student-to-faculty ratio was sixteen-to-one. Sixty-nine percent of NU's students are from Nebraska; the remaining thirty-one percent is made up of students from all forty-nine other states and 114 countries.

Sixty-eight percent of undergraduate students received grants and thirty-nine percent received federal loans.

=== Residence halls ===
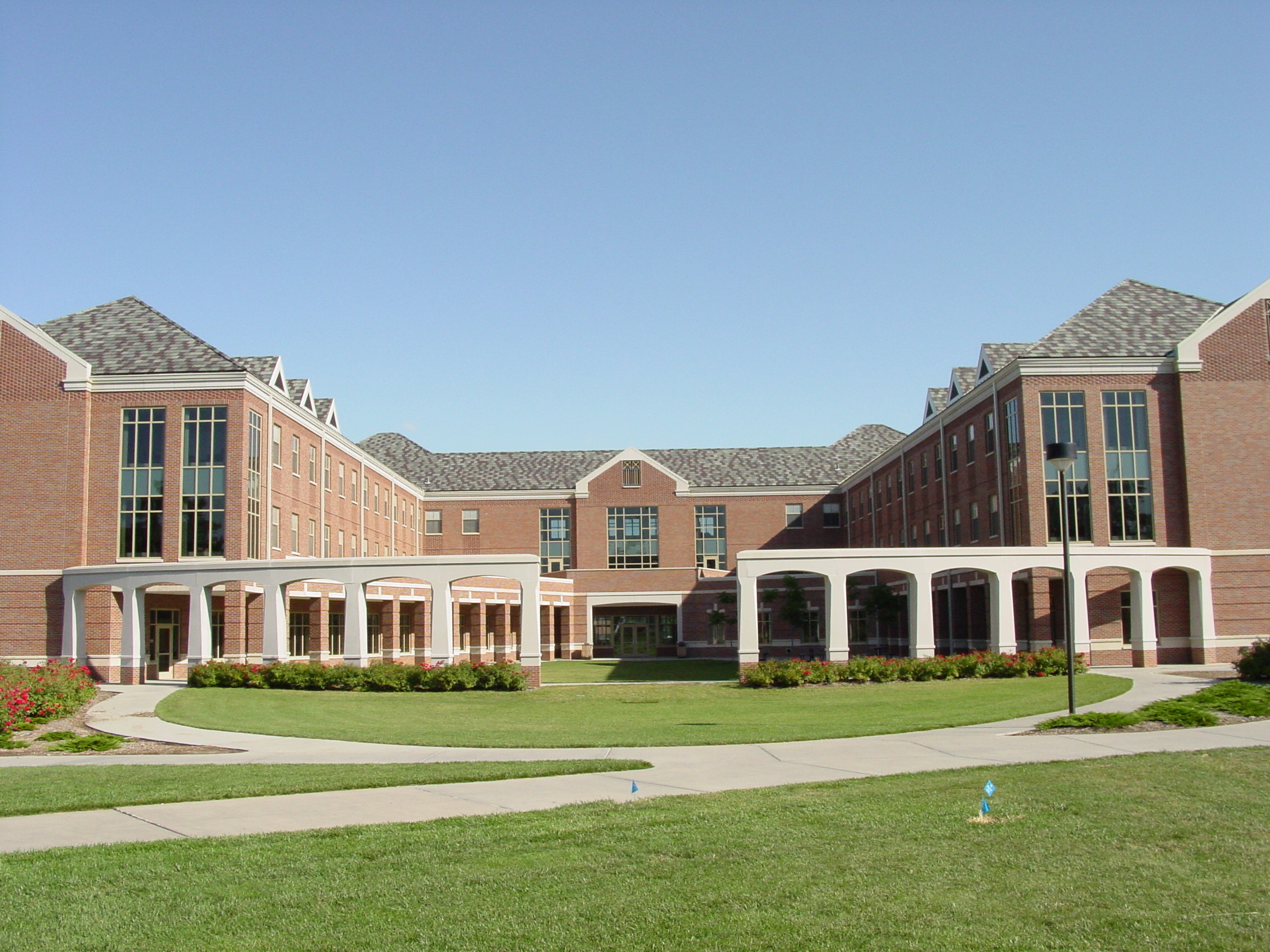
Esther L. Kauffman Academic Residential Center

On-campus students are members of the Residence Hall Association, which serves as the governing body for dormitory living. Approximately forty percent of the student body lives on-campus throughout traditional residence halls, apartment-style halls, and suite-style halls. There are seven traditional residence halls on City Campus: Abel, Harper, Kauffman Academic Residential Center, Sandoz, Schramm, Selleck Quadrangle, and Smith.

City Campus has two apartment-style halls (The Courtyards and The Village) and three suite-style halls (Eastside Suites, Knoll Residential Center, and University Suites). East Campus is home to the Massengale Residential Center, which contains both traditional and apartment-style housing, and Love Memorial Hall, an all-female cooperative facility. As of May 2025, Love Memorial Hall is no longer open to residents

Though many Greek houses opened in the 1920s, the first university-operated dormitory was not completed until the female-only Raymond Hall (now Neihardt Residential Hall, though it is not in use) was dedicated in 1932. Nebraska opened what was initially a male-only facility, the Selleck Quadrangle, in 1954, and constructed Cather and Pound Halls in 1963 to house a rapidly expanding student body. Just a few years later it opened Abel and Sandoz Halls, still the largest residency complex on campus. By the 2000s, Cather and Pound Halls were out-of-date and the university began plans to renovate or remove the buildings. After a 2014 study determined it would cost $22.7 million to bring the facility up to code, and millions more to complete a modern renovation, Cather and Pound Halls were imploded on December 22, 2017.

=== Greek life ===
Nebraska has a significant Greek population, with about 5,200 students in twenty-seven fraternities (twenty-five chapters and two colonies) and sixteen sororities. In the 2021–22 academic year, twenty-one percent of freshman males joined fraternities and twenty-six percent of freshman females joined sororities. The school's earliest surviving fraternity (Sigma Chi) was established in January 1883; Kappa Kappa Gamma became its first sorority the following year. By 1900 the campus had eleven fraternities and five sororities, and Nebraska established the Intrafraternity Council and Intrasorority Council to govern Greek life on campus.

The Society of Innocents (more commonly known as the Innocents Society) was founded in 1903 as an all-male pep group that led student rallies before football games. It is named after the thirteen popes named Innocent and each year inducts thirteen seniors (now male and female) based on academic achievement and leadership qualities. Historically, the organization has inducted new members by tackling them in a secret ceremony. A similar all-female organization, the Black Masque chapter of Mortar Board, was created in 1918.

=== Media ===
Title page of The Daily Nebraskan on October 17, 1902

The Daily Nebraskan (often referred to as "The D. N.") is Nebraska's student newspaper. It was established in 1871 as the Monthly Hesperian Student and was published every weekday during the fall and spring semesters and weekly during the summer until 2017, when students voted to reduce the paper's funding. The paper now operates mainly online, publishing only a monthly print copy. Novelist Willa Cather served as managing editor of the paper from 1892 to 1895. Though many of its writers are students in the College of Journalism and Mass Communications, The Daily Nebraskan is independent of the college.

In February 2008, the Publications Board recognized The DailyER as an affiliated publication and approved the printing costs of the first three issues of the satirical paper. The paper is published monthly during the fall and spring semesters. Despite its similarity in name, The DailyER is not affiliated with The Daily Nebraskan.

The university established NETV (later Nebraska Educational Telecommunications, now Nebraska Public Media) in 1954 on what was then Farm Campus. Initially a television station broadcasting ninety hours of local programming per week to a thirty-mile radius, the network has expanded to service all of Nebraska and is a member of the Public Broadcasting Service, while its radio stations (established in 1989) are members of National Public Radio. The school operates a Class A FM radio station, KRNU, which broadcasts on 90.3 FM over approximately twenty miles.

== Notable people ==
Since honoring its first graduating class in 1873, the University of Nebraska–Lincoln has issued over 300,000 degrees. Among these graduates are three Nobel laureates, four Pulitzer Prize winners, one Turing Award winner, twenty-two Rhodes Scholars, fifteen state governors, and twenty-three College Football Hall of Famers. Fifteen alumni have been selected as Truman Scholars and in 2010 Nebraska was named a Truman Scholarship Honor Institution.

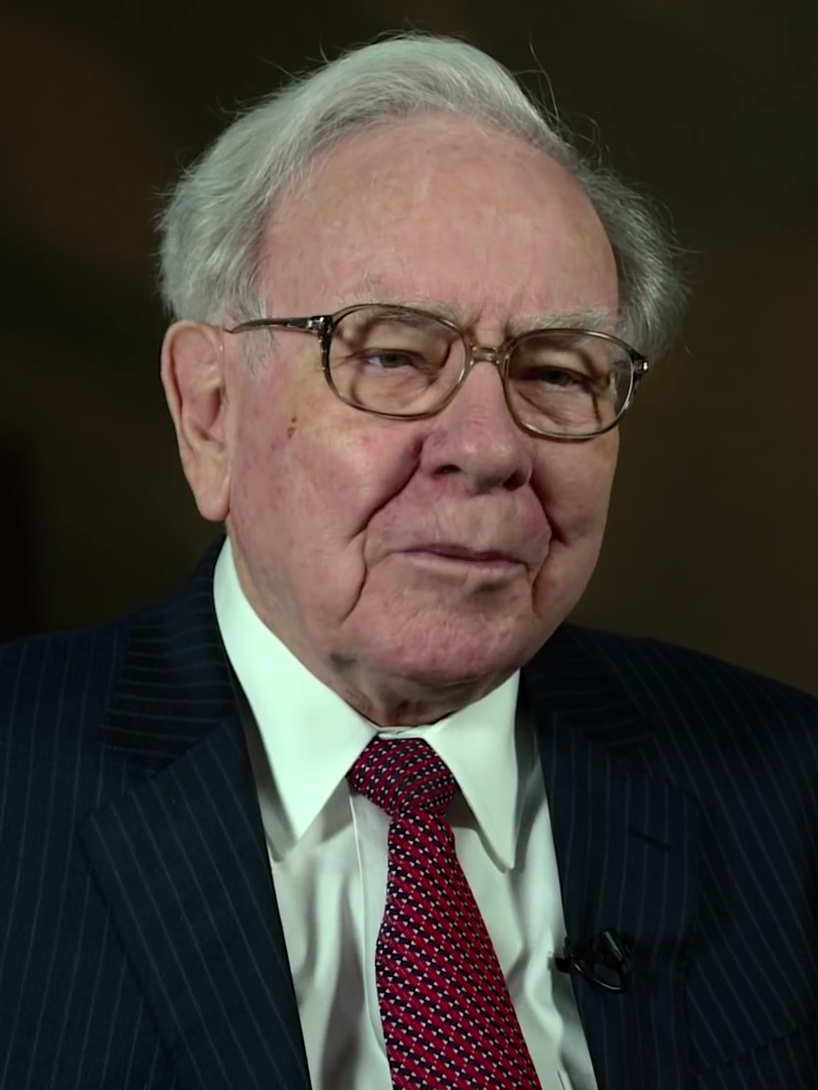
Warren Buffett, CEO of Berkshire Hathaway

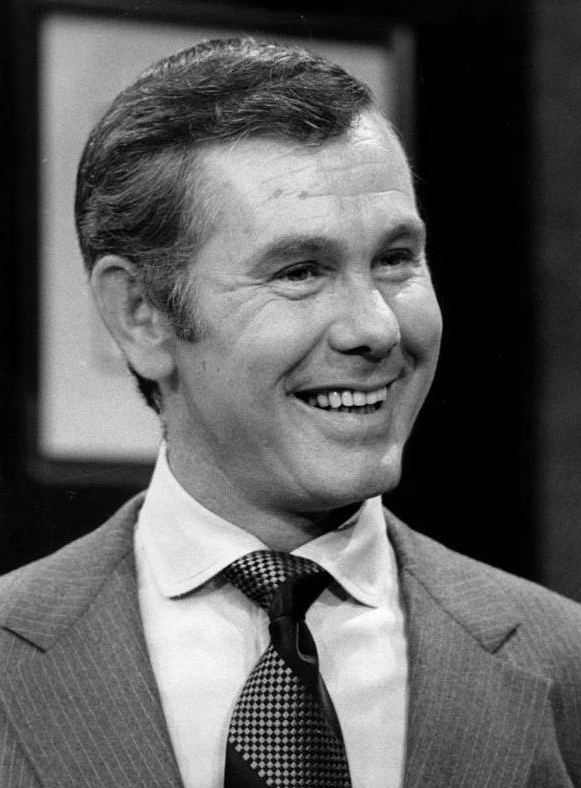
Johnny Carson, host of The Tonight Show

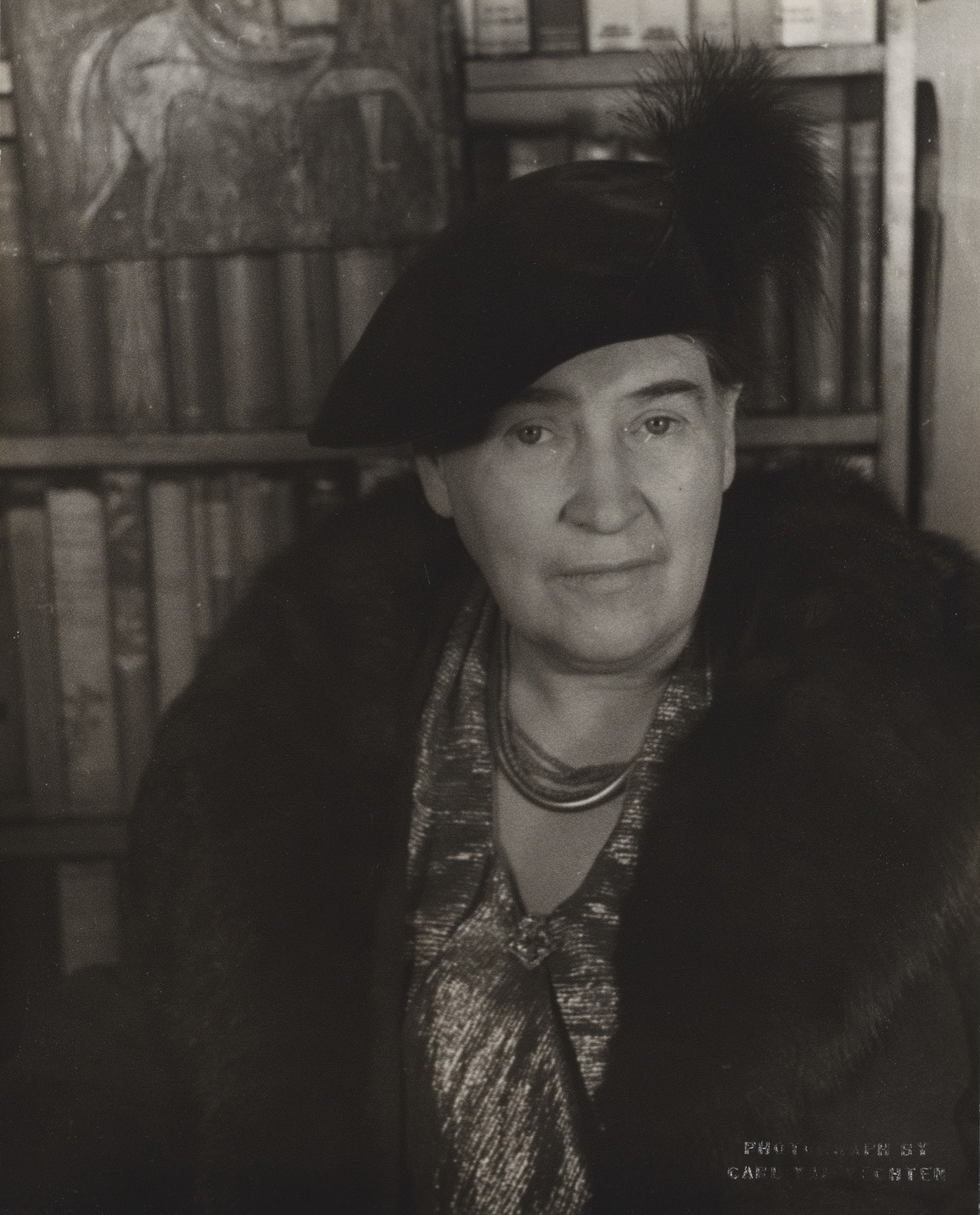
Willa Cather, novelist

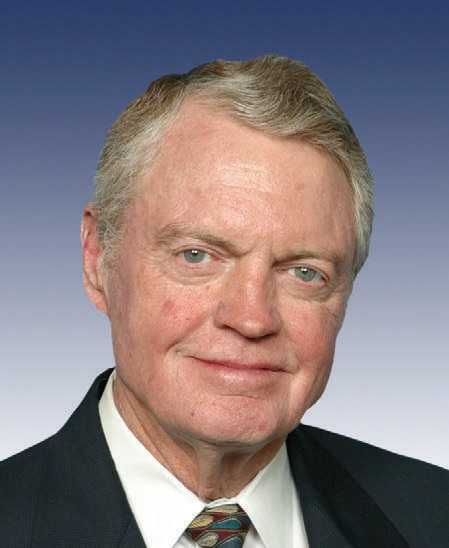
Tom Osborne, college football coach

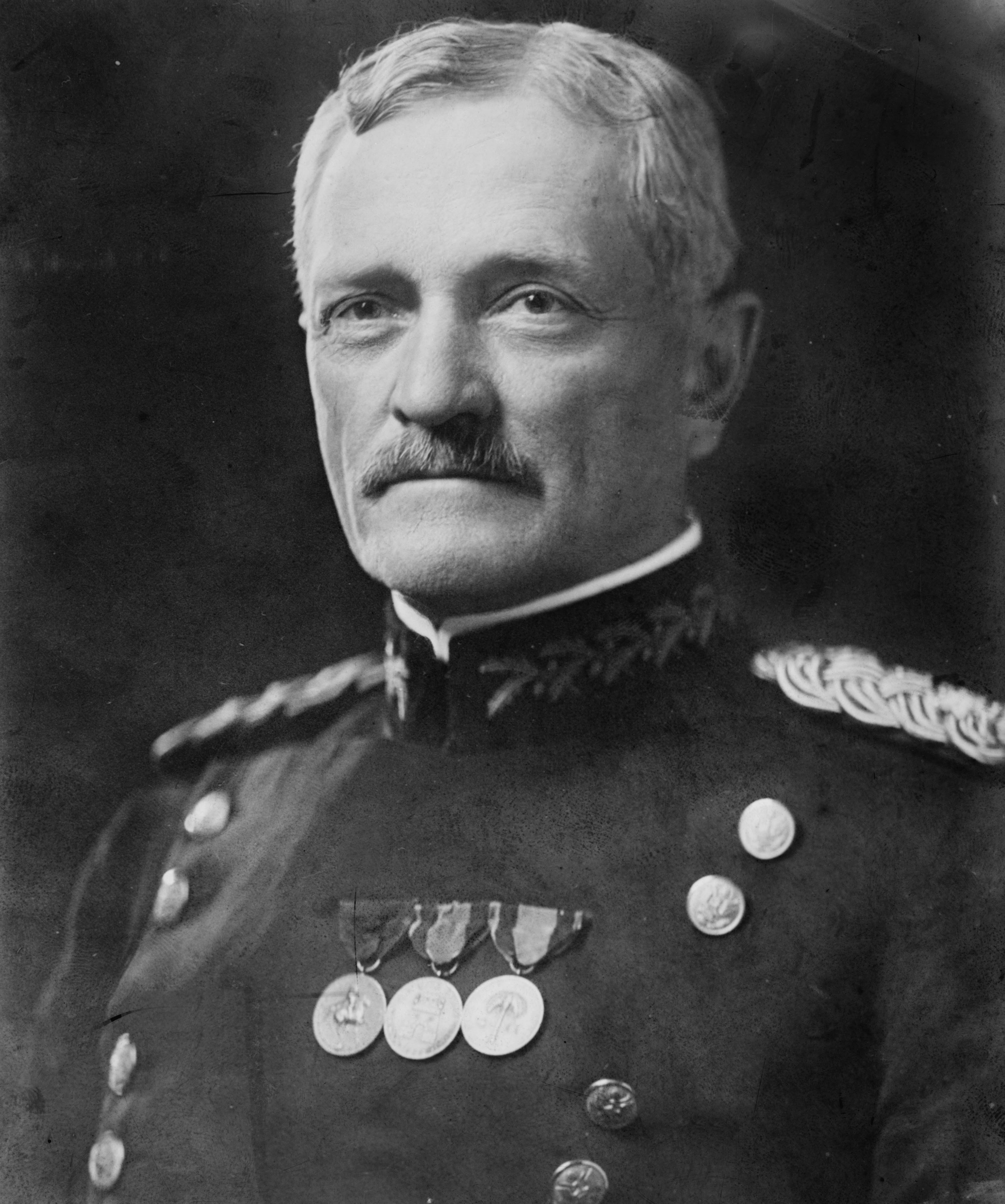
John J. Pershing, 1st general of the Armies

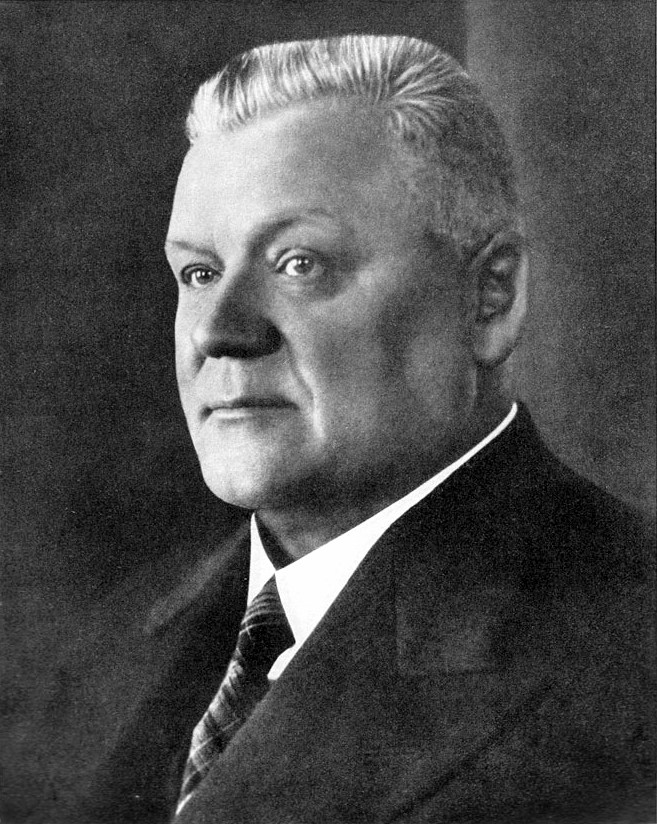
Kārlis Ulmanis, president and prime minister of Latvia

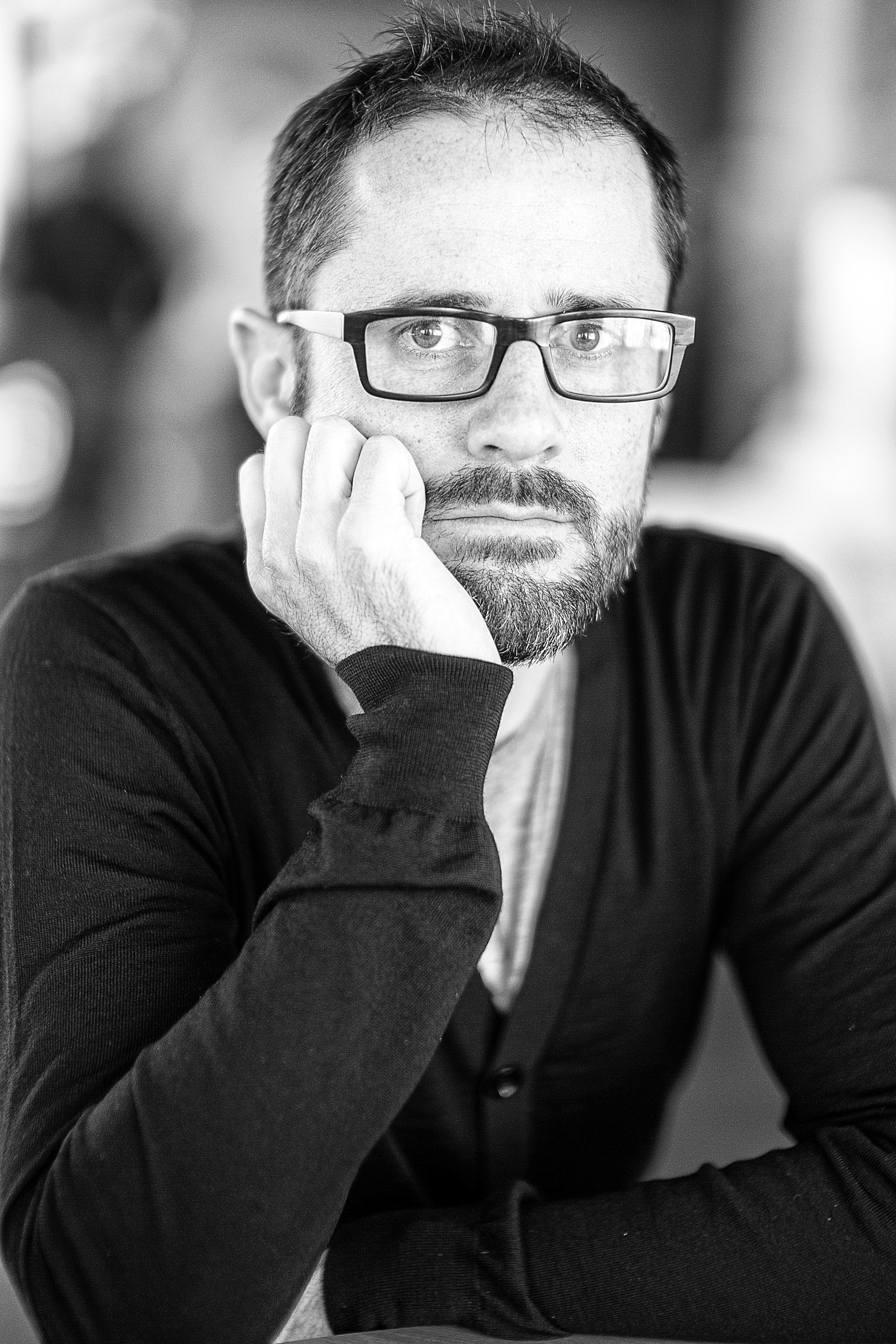
Evan Williams, co-founder of Twitter
