= College of Education and Human Sciences (University of Nebraska–Lincoln) =

College of education at the University of Nebraska–Lincoln

- Type: Public
- Established: 2003; 23 years ago
- Parent institution: University of Nebraska–Lincoln
- Dean: Jeff Reese
- Academic staff: 253 (2019)
- Students: 3,877 (2019)
- Undergraduates: 2,720 (2019)
- Postgraduates: 1,157 (2019)
- Location: Lincoln, Nebraska, United States
- Campus: Urban
- Affiliations: ACEND, ASHA, CAATE, CED, COAMFTE, NAECP, NASAD, NCATE
- Website: cehs.unl.edu

The College of Education and Human Sciences (CEHS) is one of nine colleges at the University of Nebraska–Lincoln in Lincoln, Nebraska. It was established in 2003 when the College of Human Resources and Family Sciences was merged with Teachers College. CEHS uses facilities across NU's City Campus and East Campus. Jeff Reese has served as dean since 2025.

CEHS includes seven departments: teaching, learning, and teacher education; educational administration; educational psychology; child, youth and family studies; nutrition and health sciences; special education and communication disorders; and textiles, merchandising and fashion design.

== History ==
The College of Education and Human Sciences at the University of Nebraska–Lincoln was established on June 6, 2003, when the University of Nebraska Board of Regents approved the merger of the College of Human Resources and Family Sciences and Teachers College.

In 2020, the university demolished Mabel Lee Hall and constructed Carolyn Pope Edwards Hall on the site to house CEHS. The $38-million, 126,590-square foot facility opened in 2023 and was named for Carolyn Pope Edwards, a longtime professor in the college who died in 2018.

== Programs ==
=== Child, Youth, and Family Studies ===
The University of Nebraska offered its first home economics class in 1905. The program gradually expanded and by 1962 included five departments: Family Economics and Management, Home Economics Education, Human Development and the Family, Textiles, Clothing and Design, and Food and Nutrition. Similar departments were merged when the University of Nebraska absorbed the Municipal University of Omaha in 1968.

Nebraska established a nursery school in 1925, among the first in the country. Three years later, a building specifically designed to house the child development lab was constructed under the guidance of program director Ruth Staples. Staples led the lab, later named in her honor, for nearly three decades. The program was moved to East Campus in 1969; in 2018, the university opened the Ruth Staples Child Development Lab.

=== Nutrition and Health Sciences ===
In 1891, the University of Nebraska established the Department of Health and Human Performance when physical training became mandatory for female students. Many of the school's facilities were relocated from the Home Economics Building to the Nebraska Coliseum upon its completion in 1925; a standalone Food and Nutrition Building was completed in 1943 and later renamed for longtime program director Ruth M. Leverton. The department is now primarily located across three East Campus buildings: Ruth Leverton Hall, Filley Hall, and the Gwnedolyn A. Newkirk Human Sciences Building.

The Nutrition and Health Science department includes the school's athletic training and nutrition science programs, both of which work closely with Nebraska's athletics teams. In 2022, the university opened the Scarlet Hotel on Nebraska Innovation Campus, which serves as the home of the Hospitality, Restaurant and Tourism Management program.

=== Teachers College ===
The University of Nebraska first offered pedagogy classes in 1888 and formally established Teachers College in 1908. Enrollment in the college grew rapidly following a statewide referendum in 1914 that required public school teachers to be college-educated, and in 1919 a new facility was completed to house Teachers College. The building (also named "Teachers College") was located on what was then the east edge of campus – though it has been extensively modified, the Teachers College building still exists as part of the Canfield Administration Building North. The Teachers College program was relocated to the corner of 14th and Vine Streets in the 1950s.

=== Textiles, Merchandising, and Fashion Design ===
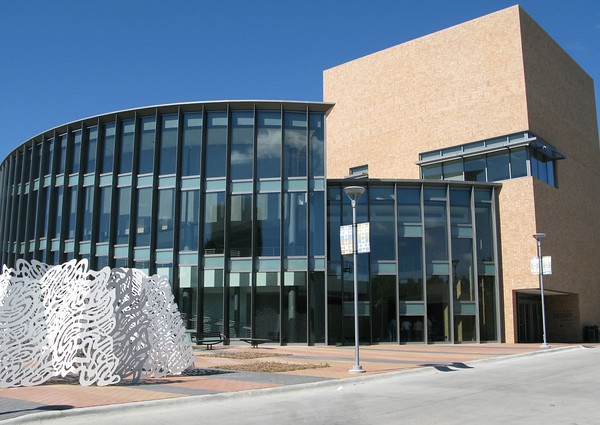
The International Quilt Museum contains the largest public collection of quilts in the world

The Textiles, Merchandising, and Fashion Design department was established at Nebraska in 1898 as the School of Domestic Science. Rosa Bouton led the program in its early years, and it quickly grew from twenty-seven students to approximately three hundred when she resigned in 1912. The School of Domestic Science initially focused on educating women in areas such as sewing, cooking, and finance, but expanded as opportunities for college women did. Eventually, the textiles school was split from the home economics school and joined what is now CEHS.

In 2020, the program was nearly eliminated as part of budget cuts attributed to the COVID-19 pandemic, but was spared following "department restructuring."

==== International Quilt Museum ====
The Textiles, Merchandising and Fashion Design school operates the International Quilt Museum, home to the largest public collection of quilts in the world. The museum was founded in 1997 as the International Quilt Study Center and Museum following a donation of approximately 950 quilts from Ardis and Robert James. In 2008, the center opened a standalone facility just south of East Campus.
