= The DailyER =

The DailyER, formerly The Dailyer Nebraskan and The DailyER Nebraskan (often referred to as The DER), established in 2008, is a satirical newspaper produced monthly during the fall and spring semester at the University of Nebraska–Lincoln. Although The DailyER has a similar name and is also university-funded, it is not affiliated with UNL's official newspaper, The Daily Nebraskan. The current editor-in-chief is Brian Streeter.

== History ==
The paper was started by Carson Vaughan, who also served as its first editor. The paper's fight and eventual victory in becoming a UNL-sanctioned newspaper created much fanfare within the Lincoln community. Other editors for The DailyER have included John Rincon, Jacob Zlomke, Mitch McCann, Alex Wunrow, Tyler Keown, Colin Loberg, Drew Preston, Kellie Wasikowski, Matt Rothgeb, Maggie Rieckman, Liam Spieker, and Brian Streeter.

In 2009, the paper went into a brief hiatus because of funding, but hosted a concert in Omaha to help pay for publishing costs.

== Content ==
The paper contains fake news stories ranging from local and campus issues, to national and international issues. The DailyER contains political, economic, social and sports stories. It also contains a serious entertainment section titled Seeds Entertainment, much like The Onion with The A.V. Club. The editors of The DailyER keep in contact with The Onion editors, using them to aid in finding sources for stories. Vaughan began contact with the staff of The Onion after a summer internship with them.

== Controversy ==
One complaint about the newspaper came about from an early article that contained the prophets Mohammad and Jesus fighting for scripture sales. The Muslim student organization of UNL complained about the article to University officials. The DailyER also frequently publishes controversial content regarding suspect University policies such as the Board of Regent's budget cuts and University firings. It also publishes many controversial articles about the University of Nebraska–Lincoln's athletics department, particularly former Nebraska Cornhuskers head football coach Bo Pelini. The DailyER was nearly shut down by University Publications officials when a satirical article was published lampooning former Defensive Coordinator Carl Pelini as having an alleged affair. The article has since been removed from The DailyER archives.

== See also ==
- List of satirical news websites
