= Nebraska Innovation Campus =

Academic research campus in Lincoln, Nebraska, U.S.

Coordinates: 40°49′58″N 96°41′33″W

- Type: Academic research campus
- Established: October 2015
- Parent institution: University of Nebraska–Lincoln
- Location: Lincoln, Nebraska, U.S.
- Campus: Urban
- Website: innovate.unl.edu

The Nebraska Innovation Campus (NIC) is a public/private research campus developed by the University of Nebraska–Lincoln. It is located in Lincoln, Nebraska, United States on the 249-acre (1.01 km^{2}) site of the old Nebraska State Fair grounds. The campus was announced in 2007, with demolition of the site commencing in 2010. Construction began in 2013 and the Nebraska Innovation Campus officially opened in October 2015.

== History ==
The Nebraska Innovation Campus was announced in August 2007. Original plans would include 17 research buildings and would contain 1,600,000 square feet (150,000 m^{2}). It would be built on the site of the old Nebraska State Fair grounds. The project was developed by University of Nebraska–Lincoln and would require demolition of most of the structures on the fairground site. The university officially purchased the site in January 2010, with demolition beginning in late 2010.

It was also announced that the 4-H Building would be salvaged, however, the fate of Industrial Arts Building was unknown at the time. The Nebraska State Legislature provided $25 million in funding for the site, helping construction begin in 2011. In 2012, it was announced that the former Industrial Arts Building would be converted into a greenhouse. This was due to opposition to the demolition of the building, which was built in 1913. Renovation and construction of buildings began in 2013. In 2014, the Conference Center opened, and it was the first building on campus to be completed. The Ice Box, a livestock show arena that was converted into an ice hockey arena in mid-1990's was also spared from demolition.

In 2015, three of the buildings were complete, with the former 4-H Building being fully renovated. Other buildings were nearing completion, with plans to have the entire campus completed by 2038. The campus had several setbacks during development and construction. Many planned buildings, like a Federal Research Center, were cancelled due to lack of private-sector interest. The Nebraska Innovation Campus officially opened in October 2015.

In March 2017, a Mill Coffee & Tea location was added to the campus. In August 2017, an additional building for the campus was announced. The building would be 80,000 square feet (7,400 m^{2}) and began construction in September. The building, known as the Rise Building, opened in 2018. In 2019, a six-story Marriott hotel began construction in June 2020 and would include 154 rooms. The hotel, named the Scarlett Hotel, opened in April 2022.

In 2024, ground was broken for a $160 million United States Department of Agriculture research center on the campus. The building was created due to a push from Nebraska lawmakers, such as Adrian Smith and Deb Fischer, to invest more in agriculture. In 2025, it was reported that funds were removed from the budget. $56 to $160 million had been appropriated by Congress, which was reportedly more than enough to finish phase one. However, the university is still waiting for federal approval to award a contractor. In July 2025, $16 million in additional funding was advanced for the project.

== Campus ==
The Nebraska Innovation Campus includes five buildings. Two buildings, the 4-H Building and the former Industrial Arts Building, were renovated for use on the campus. The campus has a six-story hotel and a coffee shop. The campus also includes the Nebraska Innovation Studio, a 16,000 square feet (1,500 m^{2}) makerspace, which opened in 2015. As of 2024, the campus currently contains 569,698 square feet (52,926.7 m^{2}). Once fully completed, the campus is intended to contain 2,200,000 square feet (200,000 m^{2}) of space.
