= KRNU =

90.3 KRNU
- Lincoln, Nebraska; United States
- Broadcast area: Lincoln area
- Frequency: 90.3 MHz
- Branding: Where New Music Beings

Programming
- Format: Indie

Ownership
- Owner: University of Nebraska–Lincoln

History
- First air date: 1970

Technical information
- Licensing authority: FCC
- Facility ID: 69268
- Class: A
- ERP: 100 watts
- HAAT: 38.0 meters (124.7 ft)
- Transmitter coordinates: 40°49′11.00″N 96°42′11.00″W

Links
- Public license information: KRNU Public file; LMS
- Website: krnu.unl.edu

KRNU (90.3 FM) is the college radio station of the University of Nebraska–Lincoln. Based at its campus in Lincoln, it airs indie rock and experimental rock, along with news updates from ABC Radio and Westwood One.

The Broadcasting Department of the University's College of Journalism and Mass Communications operates the radio station. It is managed by faculty of the Broadcasting Department. Most of the staff are students who are majoring in broadcasting.

KRNU offers many genres of music, but airs mostly indie rock and experimental rock music. Officially, it is General Format programming. Some of the other genres that are played include: Jazz, Folk, Rap, and A Cappella. There are also sports talk programs and play-by-play programs of Nebraska Cornhuskers home sporting events.

On Friday, August 17, 2009, the station launched "The New 90.3 KRNU". These changes feature a tighter rotation of independent and local artists and bands, along with less specialty show programming. The old format will continue as the web station "KRNU 2", and will feature all of the specialty shows that are not on the new "on-air" format.

== See also ==
- College radio
- List of college radio stations in the United States
