= The Daily Nebraskan =

Student newspaper of the University of Nebraska–Lincoln

- Title page of the November 14, 1902 issue
- Type: Student newspaper
- School: University of Nebraska–Lincoln
- Launched: 1871
- Language: English
- City: Lincoln, Nebraska
- Website: dailynebraskan.com

The Daily Nebraskan, established in 1871 as the Monthly Hesperian Student, is the student newspaper of the University of Nebraska–Lincoln. Although many journalism students are on staff, the Daily Nebraskan is independent of the university's College of Journalism and Mass Communications. The newspaper is entirely student-produced and managed, and has a professional general manager, Allen Vaughan, who joined in July 2019 after the retirement of Dan Shattil, who retired in October 2019 after 37 years at the helm.

A Night in the Newsroom at Daily Nebraskan

The website publishes every school day during the fall and spring semesters, with the exceptions of the Tuesday before Thanksgiving break and the last four days of finals week. It publishes weekly during summer sessions. The Daily Nebraskan covers campus and Lincoln news, along with arts, entertainment, and sports. There is also an opinion page featuring student columnists. In addition, other articles published include the 1948 Nebraska parking riots, the campus strike of 1970, and articles that were written by Warren Buffett's parents.

== History ==
The Daily Nebraskan was first published as a monthly and a weekly edition before becoming a daily paper. Its official birthday is June 13, 1901. As the newspaper's style and content changed, so did its identity and moniker. From 1871 to 1885, the paper was published by the Palladian Literary Society and known as the Monthly Hesperian Student. The first editor of the Hesperian was W.L. Sweet and the paper contained only six sections.

In 1885 the name was shortened to The Hesperian. At that time the University of Nebraska–Lincoln had multiple student publications; one of these, The Nebraskan, also known as The Rag after its editor, was founded in 1892 by Frank T. Riley. For seven years UNL would have two weekly newspapers until The Daily Nebraskan was organized on January 13, 1901, as a consolidation of The Hesperian and The Nebraskan. The evolved newspaper flourished beyond rival publications.

While the editorship of the paper was first elected by the student body as an official publication, the paper is now financially supported through advertising and student fees. Of its leaders, the most well-known is notable Nebraskan author Willa Cather. In 1892, Cather became the literary editor of The Hesperian; in November 1893 she was named the managing editor. Cather would hold this position until she graduated from the university in 1895.

In the mid-2000s, the daily paper converted to publishing tri-weekly, on Mondays, Tuesdays and Fridays. Later, it switched to a twice a week schedule. Beginning in the fall of 2017, the DN was to complete its transition to a digital-first publication at its dailynebraskan.com web address, and print a monthly newsmagazine.

== Satire ==
Throughout its publication, the Daily Nebraskan has always included pieces of satire. For most of its history the paper collected articles with a satirical tone over the course of the year and assembled them together for the April 1 publication. Iterations of this special daily edition were sometimes jokingly referred to as the Daily Halfaskan. Like the front page included on the left, the satirical papers published on April Fools were humorous and lampooned facets of university life in Nebraska.

Students of satire at UNL found this single issue of satire too limiting a venue and decided to launch an additional student paper. In 2008, The DailyER was launched as a bi-weekly publication dedicated to satirical and radical news.
