= James Linder =

American author and businessman (born 1954)

Interim President of the University of Nebraska system
- In office June 1, 2014 – April 12, 2015
- Preceded by: James Milliken
- Succeeded by: Hank Bounds

Personal details
- Born: October 21, 1954 (age 71) Omaha, Nebraska, U.S.
- Spouse: Karen Linder
- Education: Iowa State University; Duke University
- Alma mater: University of Nebraska Medical Center
- Occupation: Advisor, former CEO of Nebraska Medicine; Professor Emeritus
- Website: unmc.edu

James Linder (born 1954) is an American author, academic and businessperson, as well as an authority on university research commercialization. He is an advisor to Nebraska Medicine, following his tenure as its chief executive officer (CEO) and board chair. Formerly, he was president of the University Technology Development Corporation and chief strategist for the University of Nebraska system. He is also a professor of pathology and microbiology at the University of Nebraska Medical Center.

== Early life and education ==
A native to Omaha, Linder earned his B.S. degree in biochemistry and microbiology from Iowa State University in 1976, and his M.D. degree, with distinction, from the University of Nebraska Medical Center (UNMC) in 1980. He completed his residency training in pathology at Duke University Medical Center and UNMC.

== Academic activities ==
Linder was interim president of the University of Nebraska system from May 2014 until April 2015. He has been on the UNMC faculty since 1983 when he joined the Pathology and Microbiology department. In 1986 he was named associate professor and in 1989 was named professor. He has held numerous administrative positions at UNMC, including vice chairman of Pathology and Microbiology, director of Surgical Pathology, director of Cytopathology, associate dean for Academic Affairs and interim dean of Medicine. He was associate vice chancellor for Research from 2005-2009, and was responsible for developing clinical research and intellectual property programs at UNMC. He was visiting professor at the Peter Kiewit Institute. In January 2007, UNMC's intellectual property office merged with UNeMed, and Linder was appointed president of the expanded operation.

He is a former president of the American Society for Clinical Pathology. He is a frequent guest lecturer, and has written five textbooks and more than 130 professional articles. He is on several editorial boards, including the American Journal of Clinical Pathology and Modern Pathology. He is a member and has had leadership positions with many medical organizations, and active in the development of the Interactive Center of the U.S.-Canadian division of the International Academy of Pathology.

He holds numerous patents, and his academic interests include the application of technology in medical diagnostics, including immunochemistry, molecular diagnostics, computer-aided instruction, digital imaging in pathology, and the use of automated techniques in cytopathology and hematology.

== Business activities ==
From 1995 to 2007 he was medical director of Cytyc Corporation, a company based in Marlborough, Mass. dedicated to women's health. A main area of interest was improving Pap testing.

From 2009 to 2013, he was founding chief medical officer for Constitution Medical Investors. The company was later acquired by the Roche Diagnostics, in 2013, and Linder stayed on, until 2015, as Chief Medical Officer, and developed a hematology analyzer. Linder and his wife, Karen Linder, are founders and managing directors of Linseed Capital, LLC, which invests in early-stage companies, and of Tethon3D, which develops materials for ceramic 3D printing.

In July 2025, Linder stepped down as CEO and chairman, becoming a special advisor to the Nebraska Medicine board.

He previously chaired the board of Nobl Health, a company which provides nursing-management software, and also chaired the scientific advisory board of Streck Corporation, a manufacturer of clinical laboratory products.

== Awards and honors ==
Linder has been accorded several professional honors and awards. In 2015, recognizing accomplishments in laboratory medicine and technology transfer, he was inducted as a fellow of the National Academy of Inventors. In 2014 he and Karen Linder received the Entrepreneurial Leadership Award. In 2013 Linseed Capital was recognized as Investor of the Year by the Silicon Prairie News. In 2005, he was presented with the American Society of Clinical Pathologists' "Israel Davidsohn Award for Distinguished Service." He received the Iowa State University Distinguished Alumni Award, in 2020, and he and Karen Linder were inducted into the Omaha Business Hall of Fame.

== Boards and community service ==
Linder is the former chairman of the Nebraska Medicine board of directors.

From 1999-2001, he was on the board of directors of the Omaha Children's Museum. He was chairman of the board of KANEKO, an organization devoted to fostering creativity, and is chair of the Kaneko Creative Council. He was a regional board member of the Pipeline Entrepreneurship Program. He is a trustee the Committee for Economic Development of the Conference Board and a member of the CNBC CEO Council.

== Personal and family ==
Linder is married to Karen Linder SCT(ASCP), president of Tethon 3D and author of The Women of Berkshire Hathaway. They have five children.

Preceded by Dr. Philip Barney, M.D.	President of American Society for Clinical Pathology; 1998–1999	Succeeded by Dr. Stebbins Chandor, M.D.
