= College of Engineering (University of Nebraska–Lincoln) =

Engineering school of the University of Nebraska–Lincoln

Coordinates: 40°49′16.9″N 96°41′48.7″W

- Type: Public
- Established: 1909; 117 years ago
- Parent institution: University of Nebraska–Lincoln
- Affiliations: ABET, ASEM
- Dean: Lance C. Pérez
- Faculty: 169 (2019)
- Students: 4,353 (2025)
- Undergraduates: 3,722 (2025)
- Postgraduates: 631 (2025)
- Location: Lincoln, Nebraska, United States
- Campus: Urban
- Website: engineering.unl.edu/

The University of Nebraska–Lincoln College of Engineering is the engineering college at the University of Nebraska–Lincoln in Lincoln, Nebraska. The college was formally established in 1909, though the university began offering engineering classes in 1877. Since 1970, it has also encompassed the students and facilities at the University of Nebraska Omaha. Lance C. Pérez has served as dean of the college since 2018.

The College of Engineering was ranked seventy-first by U.S. News & World Report in its 2024 ranking of undergraduate engineering programs. It is made up of seven departments: Biological Systems Engineering, Chemical and Biomolecular Engineering, Civil and Environmental Engineering, the Durham School of Architectural Engineering and Construction, Electrical and Computer Engineering, Mechanical and Materials Engineering, and the School of Computing.

== History ==
The University of Nebraska established the Industrial College in 1872 and five years later offered its first engineering course, though only one student was enrolled. NU's engineering programs initially shared Nebraska Hall (a different building than present-day Nebraska Hall) with the agricultural programs of Industrial College. In response to rapidly increasing enrollment in engineering courses, the university constructed Mechanical Arts Hall (later renamed Stout Hall in honor of Oscar Van Pelt Stout, who served as dean of the college from 1912 to 1920) in 1898 to serve as the home of its engineering and mathematics departments. Separate Colleges of Agriculture and Engineering were formally established in 1909.

Shortly after Mechanical Arts Hall was completed, construction began nearby on a new home for the mechanical engineering department. The Mechanical Engineering Laboratories building was opened in 1910 and contained woodworking and machine shops, a foundry, and several laboratories, allowing engineering courses to become more practical and specialized. The building was later renamed for head architect C. R. Richards, the Associate Dean of the Industrial College at the time of construction; Richards Hall was renovated in 2000 and is now primarily used by the Department of Art and Art History.

By the 1920s, Nebraska's electrical engineering department was too large for the antiquated building it had used since its establishment in 1895. Following delays due to the Great Depression and World War II, Ferguson Hall opened in 1950 as the home of electrical engineering and the College of Engineering's administrative offices.

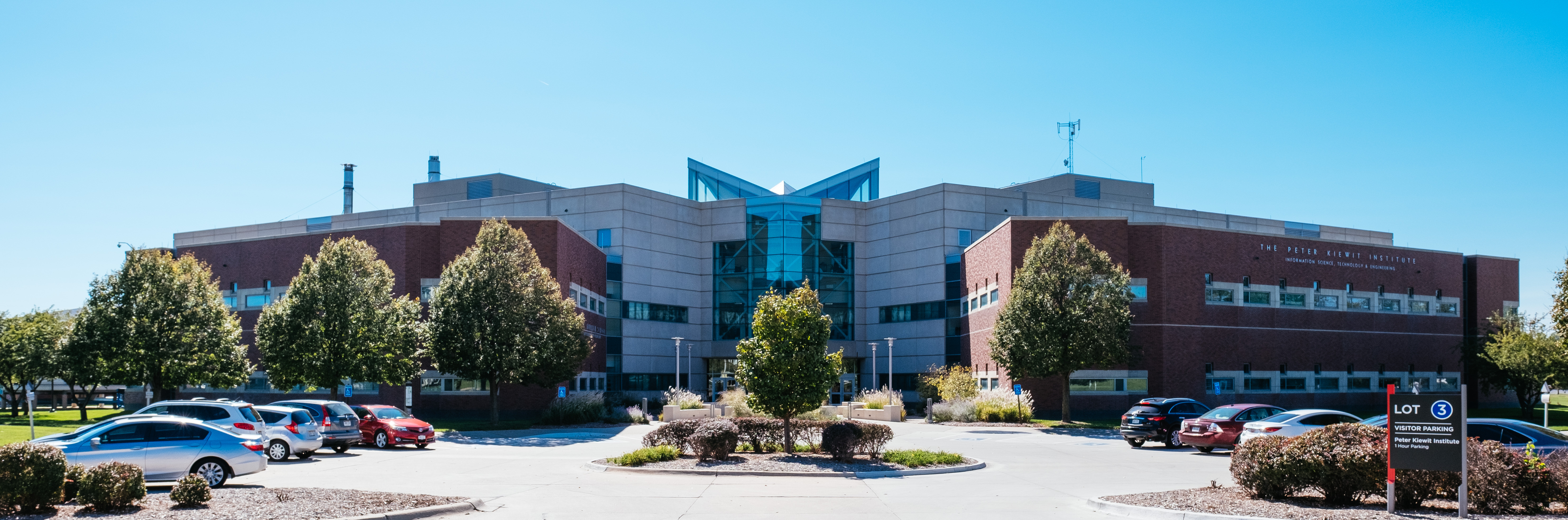
The College of Engineering operates the Peter Kiewit Institute in Omaha.

The college established a chemical engineering department in 1958. The same year, it purchased a warehouse from the Elgin National Watch Company off the northeast corner of City Campus and remodeled it as Nebraska Hall. Most of the college's offices and classrooms were relocated to Nebraska Hall over the following decade and the Scott Engineering Center was completed in 1972 to house many of the department's laboratories and research centers.

The University of Nebraska–Lincoln absorbed the Municipal University of Omaha (now the University of Nebraska Omaha) in the 1950s to form the University of Nebraska system. The College of Engineering from the two schools merged – the Omaha campus has its own facilities, but its degree programs, faculty, and funding come from Lincoln, and its students are considered part of the Lincoln university.

In 2020, the College of Engineering began construction on the $115-million Kiewit Hall, located just east of Nebraska Hall and the Scott Engineering Center. Kiewit Hall was the second of three phases in a $190-million project that also involved construction of the Engineering Research Center and a complete remodeling of the Scott Engineering Center.

=== Peter Kiewit Institute ===
The Peter Kiewit Institute in Omaha was founded in 1996 in partnership with private-sector companies, most notably the Kiewit Corporation. The institute "helps meet the needs of the nation's technology and engineering firms by providing a top-flight education to students interested in pursuing careers in information science, technology and engineering." The Holland Computing Center in Omaha is located inside the Peter Kiewit Institute.

== Research ==
The College of Engineering operates thirty-nine research centers it describes as "core facilities," and is affiliated with several other organizations.

=== Core facilities ===
- Bioinformatics Core Research Facility
- Biological Process Development Facility
- Biomedical and Obesity Research Core
- Bureau of Sociological Research
- Central Plains Federal Statistical Research Data Center
- CryoEM Core Facility
- Edgeworks
- Electron Nanoscopy Instrumentation Facility
- Flow Cytometry Core Facility
- The Food Processing Center
- Holland Computing Center
- Life Sciences Annex and Manter Hall
- Longitudinal Networks Core
- Magnetic Resonance Imaging Facility
- Methodology and Evaluation Research Core Facility
- Morrison Microscopy Core Facility
- Nano-Engineering Research Core Facility
- Nanofabrication Cleanroom Facility
- Nanomaterials and Thin Films Facility
- Nebraska Center for Mass Spectrometry
- Nebraska Center for Research on Children, Youth, Families and Schools
- Nebraska Innovation Studio
- Nebraska Water Sciences Laboratory
- NIMBUS Outdoor Netted Facility
- Physical Properties Instrumentation Facility
- Plant Phenotyping Facilities
- Plant Transformation Research Facility
- Proteomics and Metabolomics Core Facility (Redox)
- Proteomics and Metabolomics Facility (Biotech)
- Quantitative Life Sciences Initiative
- Research Instrumentation Facility
- Single Cell Genomics Core Facility
- Smart Lab
- Spectroscopy and Biophysics Core
- Surface and Materials Characterization Facility
- Systems Biology Core Facility
- University of Nebraska State Museum
- University of Nebraska-Lincoln Libraries Data Management Services
- X-Ray Structural Characterization Facility

=== Holland Computing Center ===
The Holland Computing Center is a high-performance computing core with locations at the Schorr Center for Computer Science and Engineering in Lincoln and the Peter Kiewit Institute in Omaha. It was named after donor Richard Holland.

Swan is HCC's most powerful supercomputer, and is used as the primary computational resource for researchers across the University of Nebraska system. HCC operates three other supercomputers: Anvil, Attic, and Red. Two of HCC's retired supercomputers, Crane and Firefly, ranked highly in TOP500 rankings of the world's most powerful non-distributed computer systems.

=== Midwest Roadside Safety Facility ===
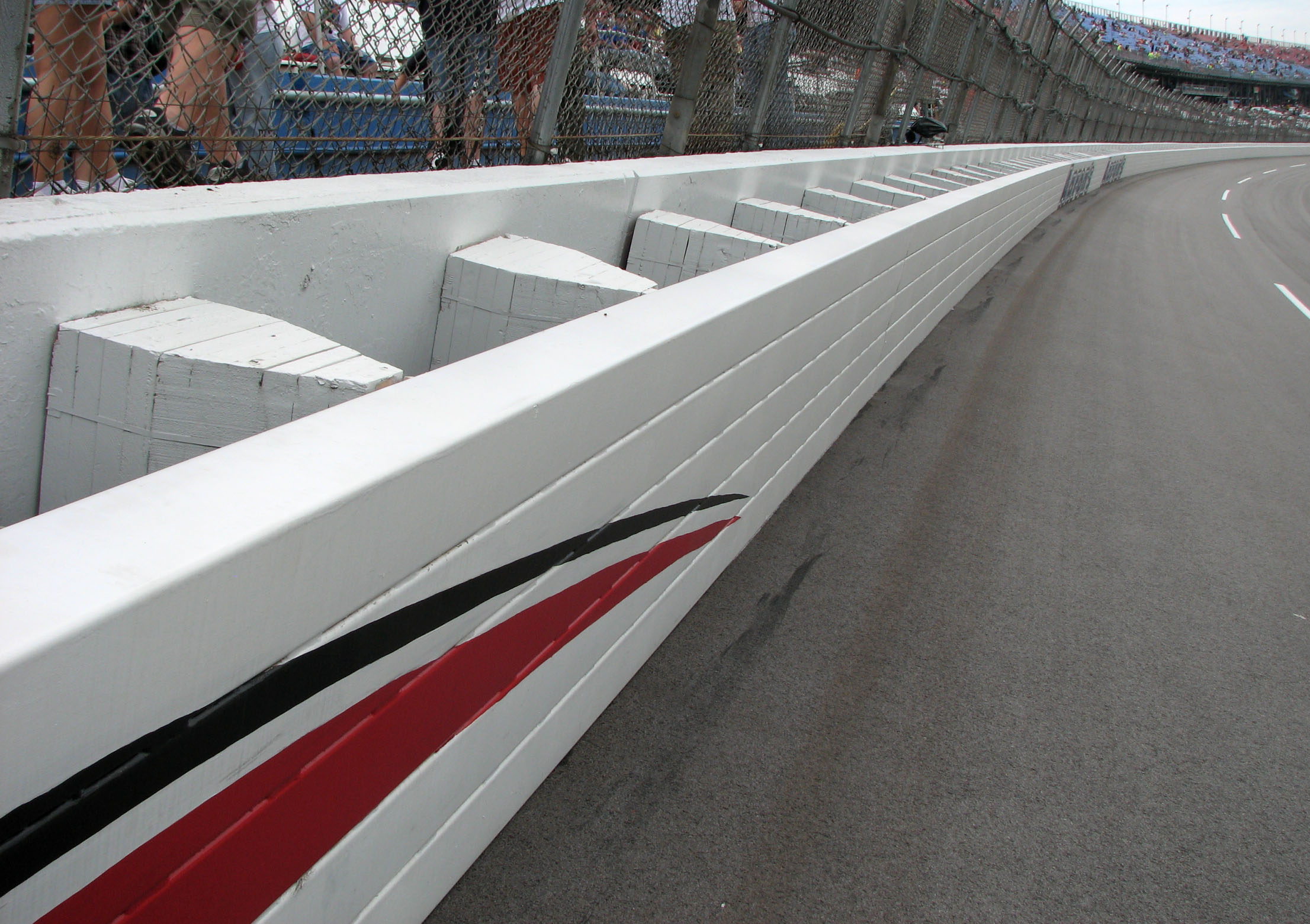
Researchers at the Midwest Roadside Safety Facility designed the SAFER barrier, shown here at Talladega Superspeedway

The College of Engineering operates the Midwest Roadside Safety Facility, which researches highway design and safety with a particular emphasis on safety performance evaluations of roadside appurtenances. Since its establishment in 1974, the facility has evaluated existing barriers and frequently developed new design concepts and technologies for use on public roadways. The facility is headquartered at the Prem S. Paul Research Center just east of NU's City Campus and uses an approximately quarter-mile stretch of runway at the Lincoln Airport to conduct crash tests. MwRSF receives funding from the National Cooperative Highway Research Program and frequently presents at the Transportation Research Board Annual Meeting.

MwRSF engineers designed and tested the SAFER barrier, an energy-absorbing "soft wall" system installed at all high-speed oval race tracks used by NASCAR and IndyCar.
