= Pascagoula-Gautier School District =

School district in Mississippi

Coordinates: 30.358835°N 88.554394°W

Address
- 1006 Communy Avenue Pascagoula, MS, 39567; United States

District information
- Grades: PreK–12
- Established: 1912; 114 years ago
- Superintendent: Dr. Carterria Payton
- Asst. superintendent(s): Belinda Dammen
- School board: 5 members
- Accreditations: Southern Association of Colleges and Schools (SACS) and Mississippi Department of Education Office of Accreditation
- Schools: 19
- Budget: $78 million

Students and staff
- Students: 6,590 (2024-25)2803480
- Teachers: 514.21 (FTE) (2016–17)
- Staff: 2,001
- Student–teacher ratio: 14.11∶1 (2016–17)

Other information
- Website: www.pgsd.ms

The Pascagoula-Gautier School District is a public school system based in Pascagoula, Mississippi.

It includes Pascagoula and most of Gautier.

== Schools ==
=== Elementary schools (grades PreK-4) ===
- Arlington Elementary
- Beach Elementary
- Central Elementary
- Cherokee Elementary
- College Park Elementary
- Eastlawn Elementary
- Gautier Elementary
- Lake Elementary
- Martin Bluff Elementary

=== Academies (grades 5-6) ===
- Singing River Academy (Gautier)
- Trent Lott Academy (Pascagoula)

=== Middle schools (grades 7–8) ===
- Colmer Middle School (Pascagoula)
- Gautier Middle School

=== High schools (grades 9–12) ===
- Gautier High School
- Pascagoula High School

=== District campuses ===
- Jackson County Exceptional School
- Pascagoula Opportunity Center (POC)

Former Schools

- Jackson Elementary (closed after 2025-26 school year; students sent to Cherokee Elementary)

== History ==
=== Integration ===
Prior to integration, Pascagoula High School, then located on Pascagoula Street, served the white students of Pascagoula and Gautier. Carver High School, previously named Pascagoula Negro High School, served the black students. When the schools were integrated in 1970, all high school students attended Pascagoula High School. The old Pascagoula High School campus closed in 1997. In 2010, the old school was repurposed as a retirement home after extensive renovations that preserved the architectural features of the building.

=== New high schools ===
From 1970 to 1997, all students from both Pascagoula and Gautier in grades 10-12 attended Pascagoula High School. Sometime before 1989, 10th graders began to be housed at what was known as "The Annex" in the former Carver High School building due to the limited capacity of the old Pascagoula High School. Gautier students in grades K-9 attended schools within the city of Gautier. 9th graders in both cities attended Pascagoula Junior High School, Colmer Junior High School (also in Pascagoula), and Gautier Junior High School.

In 1997, the school district built two new high schools: one for Pascagoula and one for Gautier. This would be the first time that Gautier had its own high school.

=== Middle school reconfigurations ===
In 2009, Trent Lott Middle School and Colmer Middle School merged. All Pascagoula 6th graders attended Trent Lott 6th Grade Academy in the former Trent Lott Middle School building. Pascagoula 7th and 8th graders now attended Colmer Middle School. After renovations to Trent Lott Academy in 2011, Pascagoula 5th graders now attend Trent Lott Academy as well.

Gautier schools later reorganized similarly. In 2013, Singing River Elementary was repurposed as Singing River Academy and now holds Gautier's 5th and 6th graders. Students who used to attend Singing River Elementary were split among the three remaining elementary schools in Gautier.

== Demographics ==
=== 2024-25 school year ===
There were a total of 6,501 students enrolled in the Pascagoula-Gautier School District during the 2024–2025 school year.

=== Previous school years ===
| School Year | Enrollment | Gender Makeup | | Racial Makeup | | | | |
| School Year | Enrollment | Female | Male | Asian | African American | Hispanic | Native American | White |
|---|---|---|---|---|---|---|---|---|
| 2024-25 | 6,590 | 48% | 52% | 0.7% | 43.5% | 17.9% | 0.1% | 31.2% |
| 2005-06 | 6,748 | 48% | 52% | 1.51% | 46.53% | 3.17% | 0.22% | 48.56% |
| 2004-05 | 7,559 | 48% | 52% | 1.34% | 45.05% | 3.04% | 0.28% | 50.30% |
| 2003-04 | 7,496 | 48% | 52% | 1.59% | 44.13% | 2.63% | 0.21% | 51.44% |
| 2002-03 | 7,491 | 49% | 51% | 1.51% | 43.00% | 2.54% | 0.25% | 52.70% |

== Mississippi Succeeds report card ==
| | 2018-19 | 2019-20 | 2020-21 | 2021-22 |
|---|---|---|---|---|
| District Accountability Grade | B | B | B | |
| School Accountability Grades | | | | |
| Number of Schools With "A" Rating | 7 | 7 | 7 | 7 |
| Number of Schools With "B" Rating | 7 | 7 | 7 | 9 |
| Number of Schools With "C" Rating | 2 | 2 | 2 | 0 |
| Number of Schools With "D" Rating | 0 | 0 | 0 | 0 |
| Number of Schools With "F" Rating | 0 | 0 | 0 | 0 |

== Notable people ==
- Vick Ballard, NFL running back
- Hank Bounds, served as Superintendent of the Pascagoula School District and the former President of the University of Nebraska.
- Isaac Brown, Wichita State University basketball coach (interim)
- Terrell Buckley, NFL cornerback
- Senquez Golson, NFL cornerback
- Shane Matthews, NFL quarterback
- Lynn Thomas, NFL defensive back
- Sarah Thomas, first female NFL referee
- Jeremy England, attorney

== See also ==
- List of school districts in Mississippi
