= Ted Carter =

US Navy admiral and academic administrator (born 1959)

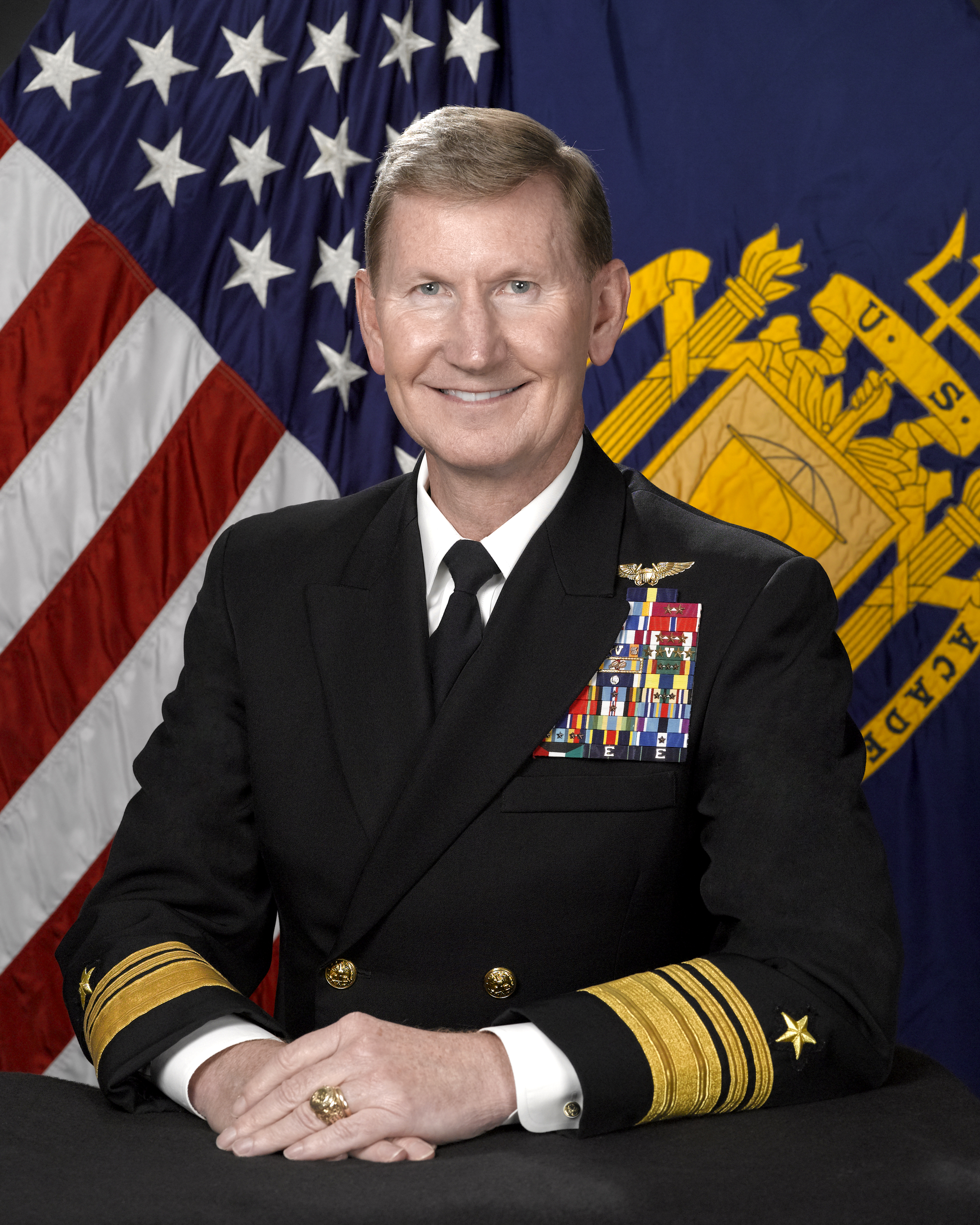
- Carter in 2015

17th President of Ohio State University
- In office 1 January 2024 – 9 March 2026
- Preceded by: Peter Mohler (acting)
- Succeeded by: Ravi V. Bellamkonda

8th President of the University of Nebraska System
- In office 1 January 2020 – 31 December 2023
- Preceded by: Hank M. Bounds
- Succeeded by: Jeffrey P. Gold

62nd Superintendent of the United States Naval Academy
- In office 23 July 2014 – 26 July 2019
- Preceded by: Michael H. Miller
- Succeeded by: Sean Buck

54th President of the Naval War College
- In office 2 July 2013 – 8 July 2014
- Preceded by: John N. Christenson
- Succeeded by: P. Gardner Howe, III

Personal details
- Born: Walter Edward Carter Jr. 4 November 1959 (age 67) Newport, Rhode Island, U.S.
- Spouse: Lynda Kohlhepp Carter (m. 1979)
- Education: United States Naval Academy (BS)
- Nickname: (Navy aviation callsign) Slapshot

Military service
- Allegiance: United States
- Branch/service: United States Navy
- Years of service: 1981–2019
- Rank: Vice Admiral
- Commands: U.S. Naval War College; Carrier Strike Group Twelve; Joint Enabling Capabilities Command, USJFCOM; USS Carl Vinson (CVN-70); USS Camden (AOE-2); VF-14 Tophatters
- Battles/wars: Operation Desert Shield; Operation Desert Storm; Operation Enduring Freedom; Operation Iraqi Freedom; Operation Southern Watch; Operation Allied Force
- Awards: Navy Distinguished Service Medal; Defense Superior Service Medal (2); Legion of Merit (3); Distinguished Flying Cross (with valor); Bronze Star; Defense Meritorious Service Medal; Meritorious Service Medal (4); Air Medal (3, 2 with valor and 5 Strike/Flight); Navy Commendation Medal (5, 2 with valor); Joint Service Achievement Medal

Walter Edward "Ted" Carter Jr. (born 4 November 1959) is an American academic administrator and retired United States Navy vice admiral. He previously served as the 17th president of The Ohio State University from 2024 to 2026.

Carter previously served as the 8th president of the University of Nebraska system from 2020 to 2023, the 62nd superintendent of the United States Naval Academy from 2014 to 2019, and the 54th president of the United States Naval War College from 2013 to 2014.

He has a record number of flights with carrier-arrested landings for his role as a naval flight officer in fighter-bombers and other aircraft in operations in Bosnia, Kuwait, Kosovo, Iraq and Afghanistan.

== Early life and education ==
Carter was born on 4 November 1959 to Walter and Dorothy Carter and raised in Burrillville, Rhode Island. He graduated from the United States Naval Academy in 1981, was designated a naval flight officer in 1982, and graduated from the Navy Fighter Weapons School in 1985. While at USNA, Carter majored in oceanography, lettered in ice hockey 4 years (team captain in 1981, and the source of his Navy callsign "Slapshot"), and was editor in chief of the USNA satirical magazine, The LOG, from 1979 to 1981. He is a graduate of the Air War College intermediate course, as well as the Armed Forces Staff College.

== United States Navy ==
His career as a flight officer includes sea assignments in Fighter Squadron 161 (VF-161) on board USS Midway (CVA-41) in Carrier Air Wing Five (CVW-5) and in the VF-21 "Freelancers" on board USS Independence (CV-62) with Carrier Air Wing Fourteen (CVW-14). He commanded the VF-14 "Tophatters", and served as Executive Officer of USS Harry S. Truman (CVN-75), culminating in command of USS Camden (AOE-2) and USS Carl Vinson (CVN-70). His subsequent fleet-command assignment was commander of the Enterprise Carrier Strike Group / Carrier Strike Group Twelve (CSG-12) during Big E's final deployment as a 51-year-old aircraft carrier.

Carter accumulated 6,150 flight hours in the back seat of F-4, F-14, and F/A-18 aircraft during his career and safely accompanied pilots in 2,016 carrier-arrested landings, the record among all active and retired U.S. Naval Aviation designators. He also flew on 125 combat missions in support of joint operations in Bosnia, Kuwait, Kosovo, Iraq and Afghanistan.

Shore assignments include instructor duty in VF-124 "Gunfighters"; chief of staff for Fighter Wing Pacific; executive assistant to the Deputy Commander, U.S. Central Command; chief of staff for Joint Warfighting Center, United States Joint Forces Command; and commander, Joint Enabling Capabilities Command where he also served as lead for the Transition Planning Team during the disestablishment of U.S. Joint Forces Command. Prior to becoming president of the Naval War College, Carter led Task Force RESILIENT as director, 21st Century Sailor Office (N17). He became the 54th president of the Naval War College on 2 July 2013.

On 23 July 2014, Carter relieved Vice Admiral Michael H. Miller, becoming the 62nd superintendent of the U.S. Naval Academy. He was succeeded by Sean Buck on 26 July 2019.

== Post-naval career ==
=== University of Nebraska ===
After retiring from the Navy in 2019, Carter became the 8th president of the University of Nebraska System on 1 January 2020. During his short four-year tenure at Nebraska, he increased enrollments by making more financial aid available to low- and middle-income Nebraskans and implemented a multi-year budget plan that included a two-year, across-the-board tuition freeze. When he left, the university was faced with a $58 million shortfall by the end of fiscal year 2024.

=== Ohio State University ===
On 22 August 2023, Carter was announced as the 17th president of The Ohio State University. His tenure began on 1 January 2024. He became the first Ohio State president in nearly 70 years who does not hold either a doctorate or medical degree. He resigned the position on 9 March 2026, after disclosing to trustees that he had had an inappropriate relationship with someone seeking public resources to support her personal business. Immediately following his resignation, the Board of Trustees requested an investigation into the surrounding circumstances. The investigation was subsequently carried out by the Office of University Compliance and Integrity and the Department of Internal Audit at the direction of the General Council. Its findings were published on 21 April 2026.

==== Commencement speaker selection ====
Carter was criticized for his selection of Chris Pan as commencement speaker after he gave a speech that was characterized by multiple media outlets as "bizarre" and dubbed by at least one as the worst ever. Pan encouraged the audience to sing-a-long to multiple songs, was booed when he told students to buy bitcoin, and staged a magic trick in which Carter transformed a quarter into a bitcoin. The speech was widely panned, and received additional attention after Pan posted on LinkedIn that he wrote the speech while high on ayahuasca. The speech generated further controversy when it was revealed that Carter had picked Pan despite Pan not having been on the selection committee's list of recommended speakers that year. Further controversy ensued after it was revealed that Carter was on the board of a crypto mining company, although Carter denied that this played any part in either Pan's selection or on the focus on crypto during the speech.

==== Response to pro-Palestinian campus protests ====
On 29 April 2024, after the Gaza Solidarity Encampment on Ohio State's campus, Carter released a campus statement saying that, in part, "What occurred on our campus on April 25 was not about limiting free speech. It was an intentional violation of university space rules that exist so that teaching, learning, research, service and patient care can occur on our campuses without interruption." In an op-ed, former OSU Professor Dr. Keith Kilty made a number of criticisms against Carter including suggesting he resign immediately.

==== Handling of sex abuse cases ====
Under Carter's leadership, the university has been criticized for its handling of the Ohio State University abuse scandal. The documentary Surviving Ohio State noted that victims have been offered lower settlement compensation amounts than victims in other large university sex abuse cases. Survivors criticized the university in an op-ed for trying to intimidate them and stated that the university was still failing them. The Columbus Dispatch also published an op-ed which criticized Carter for failing to distance the university from sex abusers by defending donors with ties to Jeffrey Epstein.

=== Academic board service ===
In April 2023, Carter was named as a Commissioner for the Council on Higher Education as a Strategic Asset.

In March 2023, Carter was elected to the American Council on Education's Board of Directors.

In 2022, Carter was named to the Executive Committee of the Council on Competitiveness.

== Awards and decorations ==
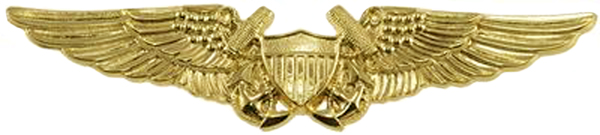

Naval Flight Officer Badge
Navy Distinguished Service Medal	Defense Superior Service Medal with one bronze oak leaf cluster	Legion of Merit with three gold award stars
Distinguished Flying Cross (with Combat V)	Bronze Star	Defense Meritorious Service Medal
Meritorious Service Medal (with 3 award stars)	Air Medal (with Combat V, 2 award stars and Strike/Flight numeral 5)	Navy Commendation Medal (with Combat V and 4 award stars)
Joint Service Achievement Medal	Joint Meritorious Unit Award (with 2 oak leaf clusters)	Navy Unit Commendation with three bronze service stars
Navy Meritorious Unit Commendation (with 4 service stars)	Navy "E" Ribbon (with Wreathed Battle "E" device)	Navy Expeditionary Medal
National Defense Service Medal (with 1 service star)	Armed Forces Expeditionary Medal (with 1 service star)	Southwest Asia Service Medal (with 3 service stars)
Kosovo Campaign Medal (with 1 service star)	Afghanistan Campaign Medal (with 1 service star)	Global War on Terrorism Expeditionary Medal
Global War on Terrorism Service Medal	Armed Forces Service Medal	Humanitarian Service Medal
Navy Sea Service Deployment Ribbon (with 8 service stars)	Navy and Marine Corps Overseas Service Ribbon	NATO Medal for Kosovo (with 1 service star)
Kuwait Liberation Medal (Kuwait)	Navy Expert Rifleman Medal	Navy Expert Pistol Shot Medal

In 1999, Carter was awarded the Vice Admiral James Bond Stockdale Award for Inspirational Leadership.

In 2008, Carter was appointed an Honorary Master Chief by the Master Chief Petty Officer of the Navy.

In 2009, Carter received the U.S. Navy League's John Paul Jones Award for Inspirational Leadership.

In 2014, Carter was inducted into the Rhode Island Aviation Hall of Fame.

In 2015, Carter was inducted into the Rhode Island Heritage Hall of Fame.

In 2019, Carter received the USS MIDWAY's Patriot Award in honor of the 50th Anniversary of TOPGUN.

In 2022, Carter received the U.S. Naval Academy's Distinguished Graduate Award. He is one of the youngest graduates to receive the award since its inception.

== Attribution ==
Academic offices
Preceded by Peter Mohler; Acting	President of Ohio State University; 2024–2026	Succeeded by Ravi V. Bellamkonda
