= President of the University of Nebraska =

Head of the University of Nebraska system

- Incumbent; Jeffrey P. Gold since July 1, 2024
- University of Nebraska system
- Reports to: Board of Regents
- Appointer: Board of Regents
- Precursor: Chancellor of the University of Nebraska–Lincoln
- Inaugural holder: Clifford M. Hardin
- Formation: November 1, 1968
- Salary: $1,062,573
- Website: nebraska.edu/president

The president of the University of Nebraska is the chief administrator of the University of Nebraska system and is selected by the university system's board of regents. Nine individuals have held the post as well as four others in an interim capacity. The position has been held by Jeffrey P. Gold since July 1, 2024.

== History ==
The Municipal University of Omaha (now the University of Nebraska Omaha) was founded in 1908, and by the 1950s was run-down and inadequately funded, threatening the existence of the school entirely. The Nebraska Legislature, faced with the prospect of its most populated city not having a major institute of higher learning of any kind, decided to merge the Municipal University with the larger University of Nebraska in Lincoln to form a state-wide university system and offer the Omaha school additional budget pools to draw from. The University of Nebraska's medical center, located in Omaha, was separated from the Lincoln school and brought under the direction of the new state-wide system.

Clifford M. Hardin, initially the chancellor of what was renamed the University of Nebraska–Lincoln, was critical to the creation of the University of Nebraska system and was named its first chancellor on July 1, 1968. (Note: Initially, the heads of the individual universities were termed "president" and the head of the state-wide system was the "chancellor." These terms were swapped in August of 1971) In sixteen years as an administrator at Nebraska, Hardin greatly increased enrollment and improved salaries and benefits for faculty. After two years serving as the head of the University of Nebraska system, Hardin was named United States secretary of agriculture under President Richard Nixon.

Durwood B. Varner was appointed chancellor of the University of Nebraska system in 1970, and a year later became the system's first "president" following a title change. As the president of a new university system with one very large school and two much smaller ones, Varner's primary task was to ensure the schools operated on "equal standing." Varner left the post in 1976 to become president of the University of Nebraska Foundation, where he spearheaded fundraising for the Lied Center for Performing Arts, which opened in 1990. The Board of Regents selected Omaha chancellor Ronald Roskens as Varner's successor. Roskens became NU's longest-tenured president, serving from 1977 to 1989, and established strong overseas relationships with universities from Afghanistan and China. During his term, the university's appropriations doubled and its endowment fund increased seven-fold. However, Roskens was fired after a seven-to-one vote of the Board of Regents in 1989; the reasoning for his removal is unclear as all parties involved were advised against making public statements. Just weeks after Roskens was fired as NU's president, he was appointed administrator of the United States Agency for International Development under George H. W. Bush.

University of Nebraska–Lincoln chancellor Martin Massengale was named acting president of the NU system in 1989 and appointed to the full-time position in 1991. Massengale served for another three years, supporting agricultural research and overseeing the creation of NU's Center for Grassland Studies. The NU system added a fourth school, the University of Nebraska at Kearney, during Massengale's tenure. He retired from administrative work in 1994 and was inducted into the United States Department of Agriculture Hall of Fame in 2004. L. Dennis Smith was selected as NU's fifth president and quickly began a significant renovation of many NU facilities. During his ten years as president, over five million square feet of classrooms, laboratories, and dormitories were renovated or constructed.

The Board of Regents named Fremont native James Milliken NU's president in 2004. Milliken prioritized tuition assistance programs for students from Nebraska, resulting in a significant increase in enrollment across the four NU campuses during his ten-year tenure. Milliken announced his intention to leave NU to become chancellor of the City University of New York on January 16, 2014. Nebraska Medicine chief executive officer James Linder served as interim president until Hank Bounds was named NU's seventh president in 2015. Bounds served for four years before stepping down in 2019, though he was retained by the university as a consultant to help fundraise for its new football training facility in Lincoln. Former superintendent of the United States Naval Academy Ted Carter was named Bounds' replacement. Shortly after Carter's tenure began on January 1, 2020, the United States was impacted by the COVID-19 pandemic; in response, the University of Nebraska announced a two-year tuition freeze for its students.

== List of presidents of the University of Nebraska ==
The following persons have led the University of Nebraska system:

No.	Portrait	President (Birth–Death)	Term start	Term end	Ref.
Chancellors of the University of Nebraska (1968–1971)
1		Clifford M. Hardin (1915–2010)	November 1, 1968	January 19, 1969 (Note: Left Nebraska on January 19, 1969, to become United States Secretary of Agriculture while on a leave of absence from the university. Officially submitted his resignation on May 31, 1969.)	
Acting		Merk Hobson (1921–1977)	January 20, 1969	January 31, 1970	
Presidents of the University of Nebraska (1971–present)
2		Durwood B. "Woody" Varner (1917–1999)	February 1, 1970	December 31, 1976 (Note: From January 1970 to July 1971, Varner's title was "chancellor." This was changed to "president" on August 1, 1971) (Note: Resigned to become president of the University of Nebraska Foundation)	
Interim		Ronald Roskens (1932–2022)	January 1, 1977	April 16, 1977	
3		Ronald Roskens (1932–2022)	April 16, 1977	July 31, 1989 (Note: Fired by the Board of Regents)	
Interim		Martin Massengale (b. 1933)	August 1, 1989	December 31, 1990	
4		Martin Massengale (b. 1933)	January 1, 1991	February 28, 1994	
5		L. Dennis Smith (1938–2021)	March 1, 1994	July 31, 2004	
6		James Milliken (b. 1957)	August 1, 2004	May 2, 2014 (Note: Resigned to become chancellor of the City University of New York)	
Interim		James Linder	May 3, 2014	April 12, 2015	
7		Hank Bounds (b. 1967)	April 13, 2015	August 15, 2019 (Note: Resigned for personal reasons.)	
Interim		Susan Fritz	August 16, 2019	December 31, 2019	
8		Ted Carter (b. 1959)	January 1, 2020	December 31, 2023 (Note: Resigned to become president of Ohio State University)	
Interim		Chris Kabourek	January 1, 2024	June 30, 2024	
9		Jeffrey P. Gold (b. 1952)	July 1, 2024	present	

== See also ==
- Chancellor of the University of Nebraska Omaha
- Chancellor of the University of Nebraska–Lincoln
