= Ronald Roskens =

American academic (1932–2022)

10th Administrator of the United States Agency for International Development
- In office March 22, 1990 – December 1, 1992
- President: George H. W. Bush
- Preceded by: Alan Woods
- Succeeded by: J. Brian Atwood

3rd President of the University of Nebraska System
- In office January 1, 1977 – July 31, 1989
- Preceded by: Durwood Varner
- Succeeded by: Martin Massengale

11th Chancellor of the University of Nebraska, Omaha
- In office July 1, 1971 – December 31, 1976
- Preceded by: John Victor Blackwell
- Succeeded by: Del Weber

Personal details
- Born: Ronald William Roskens; December 11, 1932 Spencer, Iowa, U.S.
- Died: February 27, 2022 (aged 89) Omaha, Nebraska, U.S.
- Party: Republican
- Education: University of Northern Iowa (BA); University of Iowa (MA, PhD)

Ronald William Roskens (December 11, 1932 – February 27, 2022) was an American academic. He was the president of the University of Nebraska System from 1977 to 1989. Roskens was a member and past National President of Sigma Tau Gamma. He served as Administrator of USAID from 1990 to 1992. Ronald W. and Lois G. Roskens Hall, finished in Fall 2011, located on the campus of the University of Nebraska Omaha, is named after the Roskens.

== Early life and education ==
Roskens was born to father William Roskens and mother Delores Roskens on a farm near Spencer, Iowa in 1932. In 1950, he graduated from Spencer High School. He graduated from the University of Northern Iowa in 1953, where he received a B.A. He taught for one year at the high school in Milburn, Iowa before going to University of Iowa to receive his M.A. in 1955.

== Career ==
From 1956 to 1959, Roskens was the Assistant Dean of Men at University of Iowa. In 1959, he received his Ph.D. from the University of Iowa and moved to Kent, Ohio where he became the Dean of Men at Kent State University in 1959. Roskens worked there for the next thirteen years. He was Professor of Educational Administration and Executive Vice President for Administration at the time of the 1970 Kent State shootings.

Roskens became Chancellor of the University of Nebraska Omaha (UNO) in 1972, a position he held until 1977, when he became president of the University of Nebraska system for the next twelve years. UNO honored Roskens with the Order of the Tower award, the university's highest non-academic award, at the spring 2009 commencement ceremony. He served as Administrator of USAID from 1990 to 1992 during the presidential administration of George H. W. Bush.

== Personal life ==
After dating for two years, Roskens married Lois Lister on August 22, 1954. They had four children: Elizabeth, Barbara, William and Brenda. After retiring, Roskens and his wife lived in Bennington, Nebraska. He died on February 27, 2022, at the age of 89.

Academic offices
Preceded by Durwood Varner	President of the University of Nebraska System; 1977–1989	Succeeded by Martin Massengale
Political offices
Preceded by Alan Woods	Administrator of the United States Agency for International Development; 1990–1992	Succeeded by J. Brian Atwood
