= Timothy Wei =

Timothy Wei is an American engineer.

Wei studied mechanical engineering at Cornell University, furthered his education in the field at Lehigh University, where he earned a master's degree, then completed a PhD at in aerospace engineering at the University of Michigan. Wei taught at Rutgers University until 2006, when he joined Rensselaer Polytechnic Institute. While affiliated with RPI in 2009, Wei was elected a fellow of the American Physical Society, recognized "[f]or development of high resolution flow measurements for turbulent flow studies of relevance to fundamental fluid mechanics, industrial applications, and medicine, and contributions to the fluid dynamics profession through outreach to government and the community." In 2011, Wei was named dean of the University of Nebraska–Lincoln's College of Engineering. Wei was succeeded as dean by Lance C. Pérez, and remained on the UNL faculty as Richard L. McNeel Professor of Mechanical and Materials Engineering. Wei later moved to Northwestern University's McCormick School of Engineering, as an adjunct professor of mechanical engineering.
