= Jeffrey P. Gold =

American surgeon and academic administrator

Jeffrey Gold

9th President of the University of Nebraska System
- Incumbent
- Assumed office July 1, 2024
- Preceded by: Ted Carter

Chancellor of the University of Nebraska Medical Center
- In office February 1, 2014 – June 30, 2024
- Preceded by: Harold Maurer
- Succeeded by: Dele Davies (acting)

15th Chancellor of the University of Nebraska, Omaha
- In office May 8, 2017 – June 30, 2021
- Preceded by: John Christensen
- Succeeded by: Joanne Li

Personal details
- Born: August 16, 1952 (age 74)
- Education: Cornell University (BS, MD)

Jeffrey Philip Gold (born August 16, 1952) is an American surgeon, medical educator, and academic administrator who has been the president of the University of Nebraska system since July 1, 2024. Prior to that, he served as the chancellor of the University of Nebraska Medical Center since February 1, 2014, as well as the executive vice president and provost of the University of Nebraska system since 2021. He also previously served as the interim chancellor and then chancellor of the University of Nebraska Omaha from May 2017 to June 2021.

On April 26, 2024, the Board of Regents selected Gold to become the ninth president of the University of Nebraska, and he took office officially on July 1, 2024.

== Education ==
Graduated from Cornell University, Gold received a Bachelor of Science in Engineering degree with a major in theoretical and applied mechanics in 1974 and a Doctor of Medicine degree in 1978.

Gold did his medical residency in general surgery at New York Presbyterian Hospital and Memorial Sloan Kettering Cancer Center from 1978 to 1983, his adult cardiothoracic surgery fellowship at the Brigham and Women’s Hospital from 1983 to 1984, and pediatric cardiac surgery fellowship Boston Children’s Hospital from 1983 to 1985, respectively.

== Career ==
From 1985 to 1996, Gold was an attending surgeon and division chief of congenital cardiac surgery at New York Presbyterian and Memorial Sloan Kettering Cancer Center, and professor in cardiovascular and thoracic surgery at Weill Cornell Medical College in New York City. From 1996 to 2005, he was professor and chairman of the Department of Cardiovascular and Thoracic Surgery at the Albert Einstein College of Medicine. He was also the director of the residency program in Thoracic Surgery and Cardiovascular and Thoracic Surgeon-in-chief at Montefiore Medical Center in the Bronx, New York City.

From 2005 to 2014, Gold served as dean of the University of Toledo College of Medicine and Life Sciences. He also served as provost and then chancellor and executive vice president of the University of Toledo Medical Center.

Gold became chancellor of the University of Nebraska Medical Center on February 1, 2014. As chief executive officer, Gold was in charge of all aspects of the medical campus. Four years later, on May 8, 2018, Gold was asked by University of Nebraska President Hank M. Bounds to serve as chancellor for the University of Nebraska Omaha on an interim basis following the retirement of the university’s previous chancellor, John Christensen. In December 2018, Gold had the interim tag removed from his title and became simply the chancellor of the University of Nebraska Omaha, a position which he held until June 2021. He then transitioned to become the executive vice president and provost of the University of Nebraska system.

== Achievements, awards, and honors ==
Gold won the Medical Mission Hall of Fame's "Lifetime Achievement Award" awarded annually for exemplary dedication and achievement in medical missions (2010), the American Heart Association's "Legacy of Life" Award for exemplary leadership and dedication to improving the lives of others (2009) and he is a fellow of the American College of Surgeons, and a member of the New York Academy of Medicine.

The Jeffrey P. Gold, M.D. Scholarship for Excellence and Professionalism at the University of Toledo College of Medicine was named after him. The "Jeffrey P. Gold, M.D. Distinguished Professorship in Cardiothoracic Surgery" was established in his honor in 1995 by The Raymond & Beverly Sacker Foundation as an Endowed Professorship in cardiothoracic surgery at Weill Cornell Medical College.
