= Bellamkonda (surname) =

Bellamkonda is a Telugu surname. Notable people with the name include:

- Bellamkonda Sreenivas (born 1993), Indian film actor and model
- Bellamkonda Suresh, Indian film producer
- Ravi V. Bellamkonda (born 1968), Indian biomedical engineer
