= L. Dennis Smith =

American scientist (1938–2021)

5th President of the University of Nebraska
- In office March 1, 1994 – June 2004
- Preceded by: Martin Massengale
- Succeeded by: James B. Milliken

Personal details
- Born: January 18, 1938 Muncie, Indiana, U.S.
- Died: March 29, 2021 (aged 83) Lafayette, Indiana, U.S.
- Education: Indiana University Bloomington (B.A., Ph.D)

L. Dennis Smith (January 18, 1938 – March 29, 2021) was an American scientist and academic administrator who served as the president of the University of Nebraska system from March 1, 1994, to June 2004.

== Education ==
He graduated from Frankfort High School in 1956. Early on in his career, Smith was an aspiring jazz musician, majoring in music at Indiana University Bloomington for his first three years, playing the trumpet. While at Indiana University, he was a member of the Marching 100. He was then advised to leave the music track and shift to music education. Instead, he began studying science. Smith earned a Bachelors in zoology and chemistry and a Ph.D. in experimental embryology from Indiana University.

== Career ==
Smith held a variety of roles in the field of science, including president emeritus of the University of Nebraska–Lincoln, emeritus professor in NU's School of Biological Sciences, embryology instructor at Woods Hole Marine Biological Laboratory, staff scientist at the Argonne National Laboratory, head of Purdue University's department of biological sciences, and executive vice chancellor and acting chancellor of the School of Biological Sciences at the University of California–Irvine.

Smith has published almost 100 research papers and numerous abstracts in areas such as cell biology, developmental biology, biochemistry, and molecular biology.

As well as taking a role in the American Association for Higher Education, the American Association for State Colleges and Universities, the American Council on Education and the Association of American Universities, Smith has served on the following boards: the Association for the Accreditation of Human Research Protection Programs, the Madonna Rehabilitation Hospital, the Nebraska Arts Council, and the Nebraska Chamber of Commerce and Industry. He also enabled and supported the establishment of the Nebraska Bioethics Advisory Commission.

== Controversy ==
During his time as president of the University of Nebraska–Lincoln, much negative attention was drawn to the educational institute's research on neurodegenerative diseases (including Alzheimer's, Parkinson's, AIDS, dementia, and multiple sclerosis). The problem was grants from the National Institutes of Health were funding these studies and brain cells of fetal tissues taken from a local abortion clinic were being used. Thus both those in the field of policy-making and religion took issue with the work and he was rebuffed for being "unwise" to use public funds for this kind of work. This led to the introduction of a bill to ban the use of fetal tissue from aborted fetuses which resulted in Smith's reasoning that they were needed for research and that the bill "struck at the very heart of academic freedom." Ultimately Smith and his research was voted in by the elected Board of Regents.

== Awards ==
Smith received the 2002 Award for Scientific Freedom and Responsibility "for his steadfast commitment to academic freedom in the face of mounting social and political pressure", and "for distinguished contributions to developmental biology and leadership and advocacy on education." But Smith was also recognized by the AAAS for his work in science education and in defense of academic freedom while president at Nebraska. He was also named a Fellow on Biological Sciences.

It was Smith's original studies of cell division in frogs which help put in place the foundation used by three researchers who ultimately won a Nobel Prize in medicine for identifying the entire cycle of a cell.
