= Martin Massengale =

American academic

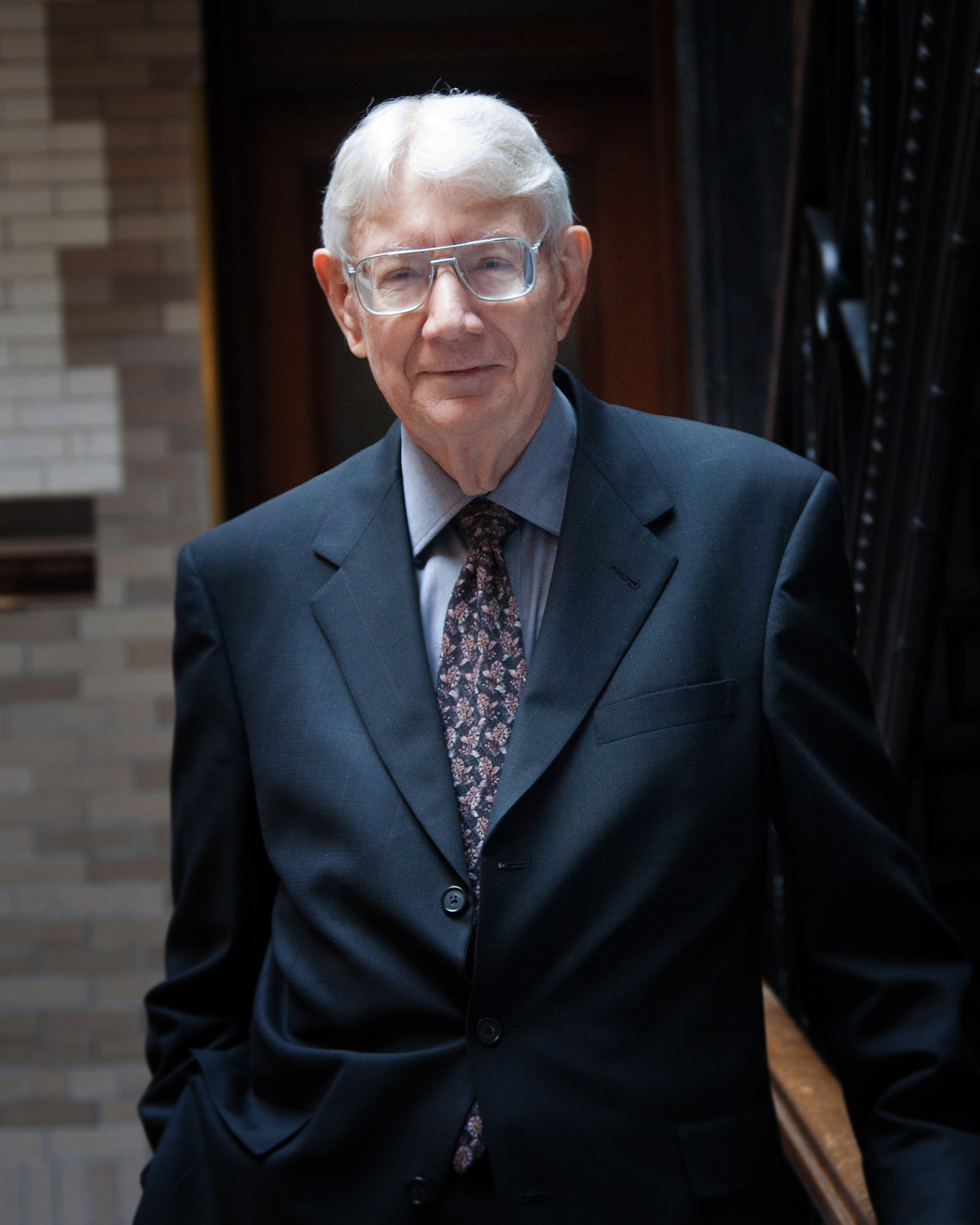

4th President of the University of Nebraska
- In office 1989–1994
- Preceded by: Ronald Roskens
- Succeeded by: L. Dennis Smith

16th Chancellor of the University of Nebraska–Lincoln
- In office June 1, 1981 – January 11, 1991
- Preceded by: Roy Young
- Succeeded by: Graham Spanier

Personal details
- Born: October 25, 1933 (age 92) Monticello, Kentucky, U.S.
- Education: University of Wisconsin; Western Kentucky University
- Occupation: agronomist

Martin Andrew Massengale (born October 25, 1933) is an American academic. He served as the Chancellor of the University of Nebraska–Lincoln from 1981 to 1991, when he resigned to become the President of the University of Nebraska system. (He had served as interim president of the University of Nebraska system after the firing of Ronald Roskens from 1989 to 1991 while still serving as chancellor of the University of Nebraska until he was offered the full-time position.)

Prior to serving as chancellor of the University of Nebraska–Lincoln, Massengale had been the vice chancellor for agriculture and natural resources since 1976.

Massengale is an alumnus of the University of Wisconsin and Western Kentucky University.

Massengale served as chairman of the NCAA Presidents Commission from 1989 through the early 1990s.
