= Chancellor of the University of Nebraska Omaha =

Head of the University of Nebraska Omaha

- Incumbent; Joanne Li since July 1, 2021
- University of Nebraska Omaha
- Reports to: President of the University of Nebraska
- Appointer: Board of Regents
- Formation: 1909; 117 years ago
- First holder: Daniel E. Jenkins
- Salary: $430,000
- Website: Office of the Chancellor

The chancellor of the University of Nebraska Omaha is the chief administrator of the University of Nebraska Omaha and is selected by the University of Nebraska system president and approved by the Board of Regents. The position has been held by Joanne Li since July 2021.

== History ==
=== University of Omaha (1909–1930) ===
The University of Nebraska Omaha, originally called the University of Omaha, was founded as a private, nonsectarian, religious institution in September 1908; however, the University of Omaha did not choose a president until a year later when classes began in September 1909. The Rev. Daniel Edwards Jenkins was appointed acting president in September 1909 and was made full president in 1910. At the time he was appointed, Jenkins served as professor of systematic theology and apologetics on the faculty of Omaha Presbyterian Theological Seminary. Jenkins served 17 years as the president of the University of Omaha before ill health due to overwork brought about his departure in December 1926. He was expected to return as president, but he never did and instead died in November 1927. W. Gilbert James, dean of the University of Omaha, served as interim president in Jenkins' absence until a successor could be found.

In July 1927, Jenkins was made president emeritus of the university when the board announced that it had hired 34-year-old Rev. Karl Frederick Wettstone, the president of the University of Dubuque, to succeed him. However, Wettstone's short tenure was tumultuous, with students hanging him in effigy and demanding his resignation after he refused to ratify a student-body election. Consequently, Wettstone resigned after only one year, citing his inability to raise funds and to obtain accreditation for the university. The university then hired E. Wesley Emery, then president of York College, to succeed Wettstone. Emery's tenure was also short since, as the university sought accreditation, the North Central Association of Colleges and Schools required that heads of universities it accredited have a Doctor of Philosophy degree, and Emery only had a Doctor of Divinity degree. Thus, after only two years of service, Emery departed, and W. Gilbert James was once again appointed acting president of the university.

=== Municipal University of Omaha (1930–1968) ===
In 1930, the city of Omaha took control of the University of Omaha, turning it into a public municipal institution rather than a private, religious university. In 1931, after an eight-month search, the Board of Regents named William E. Sealock, then dean of the teachers' college at the University of Nebraska, president of the newly created Municipal University of Omaha. Sealock was hired with the agreement that the university would move to a new location. Sealock soon ran into disagreements with the Board of Regents, leading to his removal as president four years later in June 1935. However, two regents resigned in protest, some faculty threatened to quit, and a large group consisting of students, faculty, and community members, displeased with the board's decision, rallied to ask them to reconsider and reinstate Sealock. Several days later, after being informed that the Board of Regents was unlikely to change its mind, Sealock committed suicide by ingesting poison on July 7, 1935. Close friend of the Sealock family John G. Neihardt traveled back from Missouri to attend his funeral. After Sealock's ouster, the Board of Regents failed to name an interim president and was threatened with an investigation by the American Association of University Professors. As the highest-ranking officer of the university, Edgar A. Holt, dean of the college of arts and sciences, was the de facto interim president, although the Board of Regents refused to officially appoint him due to his ardent support of Sealock after his removal. Homer W. Anderson was rumored as a possible candidate for acting president, but he declined, offering instead to act only in an advisory role.

On August 15, 1935, the Board of Regents unanimously named Rowland Haynes, former Nebraska administrator for the Federal Emergency Relief Administration, president. After serving as president for 13 years, Haynes retired due to a state law for which he had advocated that required heads of universities to retire at age 70. Haynes was named president emeritus, and the Board of Regents then appointed Milo Bail, dean of the college of education at Butler University, to succeed him. Bail would go on to become widely recognized as one of the university's most influential presidents, serving for 17 years. To succeed Bail, the Board of Regents appointed Leland E. Traywick, the formerly ousted president of Southwest Missouri State University, on February 1, 1965. However, Traywick lasted only two years before he resigned to pursue other scholarly activities. The board then appointed Kirk E. Naylor, the dean of administration at the university, to become acting president. He was later named president on June 5, 1967.

=== University of Nebraska at Omaha (1968–present) ===
In 1968, the Municipal University of Omaha was merged into the University of Nebraska system, creating the new University of Nebraska at Omaha (UNO). Three years later, after disagreements with the Board of Regents and University of Nebraska President D. B. Varner, Kirk Naylor was fired by the Board of Regents. It was at this time that the Board of Regents also changed the title of the post from "president" to "chancellor," and thus John V. Blackwell was appointed the acting chancellor until a replacement for Naylor could be found. Ronald Roskens, the executive vice president at Kent State University, was hired as the next chancellor of UNO in July 1972. Roskens later resigned his position as chancellor in 1977 to become D. B. Varner's replacement as President of the University of Nebraska. Roskens then hired Del Weber, a native Nebraskan who was serving as the dean of the college of education at Arizona State University, as his replacement as UNO chancellor. Weber went on to become the longest-serving chancellor at UNO, serving in the position for 20 years before retiring. In 1986, Weber initially accepted the top administrative position at the University of Nevada, only to turn it down the next day to remain at UNO after the faculty senate asked him to stay. Upon his retirement, a UNO campus building was named after him: the Del and Lou Ann Weber Fine Arts Building.

In 1997, Nancy Belck was appointed as UNO's chancellor. The first woman to serve in this position, she was previously the chancellor at Southern Illinois University. Nine years later, Belck resigned after controversy over how the budget of the athletic department was handled as well as allegations that she falsified an expense report. In the wake of Belck's resignation, vice chancellor for academic and student services John E. Christensen was appointed interim chancellor and was later made full chancellor. He was the first chancellor to have also been an alumnus of UNO. After Christensen's retirement, Jeffrey P. Gold, chancellor of the University of Nebraska Medical Center, was appointed interim chancellor of UNO and was later made full chancellor as well. After Gold stepped down to become the executive vice president and provost of the University of Nebraska system, Joanne Li, the first Asian-American to hold the position, was appointed UNO's 16th chancellor.

== List of chancellors of the University of Nebraska Omaha ==
No.	Portrait	Chancellor	Term start	Term end	Ref.
Presidents of the University of Omaha (1909–1931)
1		Daniel Edwards Jenkins (Note: Served as interim before being appointed to the full-time position)	September 1909	December 1926 (Note: Resigned due to declining health)	
Interim		W. Gilbert James	December 1926	September 1927	
2		Karl Frederick Wettstone	September 1927	July 4, 1928 (Note: Resigned due to conflict with students and budgetary concerns)	
3		Ernest Wesley Emery	July 4, 1928	July 17, 1930 (Note: Resigned because he lacked a Ph.D. required for accreditation)	
Interim; 4		W. Gilbert James (Note: James served as acting president from 1927 to 1928 and again from 1930 to 1931. Despite never being appointed to the full-time position, the University of Nebraska Omaha seems to number James as one of its presidents since he served for a full academic year.)	July 17, 1930	August 31, 1931	
Presidents of the Municipal University of Omaha (1931–1968)
5		William Elmer Sealock	September 1, 1931	July 7, 1935 (Note: Fired by the Board of Regents and subsequently committed suicide)	
De facto Interim		Edgar A. Holt (Note: Although he was never appointed acting president, due to the Board of Regents' failure to name an acting president during this time, Holt is reported to have been the highest ranking officer at the university and thus de facto interim president. Homer A. Anderson was an advisor during this time.)	July 7, 1935	August 14, 1935	
6		Rowland B. Haynes	August 15, 1935	June 30, 1948	
7		(Philip) Milo Bail	July 1, 1948	January 31, 1965	
8		Leland E. Traywick	February 1, 1965	December 31, 1966	
Presidents of the University of Nebraska at Omaha (1968–1971)
Interim		Kirk E. Naylor	January 1, 1967	June 5, 1967	
9		Kirk E. Naylor	June 5, 1967	August 31, 1971 (Note: Dismissed by the Board of Regents)	
Chancellors of the University of Nebraska at Omaha (1971–present)
Interim; 10		John Victor Blackwell (Note: Similarly to Gilbert James, Blackwell served as acting chancellor, and despite never being appointed to the full-time position, the University of Nebraska Omaha seems to number Blackwell as one of its chancellors since he served for a full academic year.)	September 1, 1971	June 30, 1972	
11		Ronald W. Roskens	July 1, 1972	December 31, 1976 (Note: Resigned to become President of the University of Nebraska)	
Interim		Herbert Garfinkel	January 1, 1977	August 31, 1977	
12		Delbert D. "Del" Weber	September 1, 1977	June 30, 1997	
Interim		Ernest J. Peck Jr.	July 1, 1997	August 31, 1997	
13		Nancy Belck	September 1, 1997	September 12, 2006 (Note: Resigned over mismanagement of funds)	
Interim		John E. Christensen	September 13, 2006	May 8, 2007	
14		John E. Christensen	May 8, 2007	May 7, 2017	
Interim		Jeffrey P. Gold (Note: Appointed simultaneously with his position as chancellor of University of Nebraska Medical Center)	May 8, 2017	December 21, 2018	
15		Jeffrey P. Gold	December 21, 2018	June 30, 2021 (Note: Resigned to become executive vice president and provost of the University of Nebraska system)	
16		Joanne Li	July 1, 2021	present	

== See also ==
- President of the University of Nebraska
- Chancellor of the University of Nebraska–Lincoln
