= Karen Linder =

Karen A. Linder
- Born: 1960 (age 65–66); Omaha, Nebraska, US
- Education: Nebraska Wesleyan University (BS)
- Occupations: Businesswoman, author
- Spouse: James Linder

Karen A. Linder (born 1960) is an American businesswoman, author and artist. She is CEO and president of Tethon 3D, a 3d printing company, and a principal of Linseed Capital, a private investment firm. Her book, The Women of Berkshire Hathaway, was published in 2012 by John Wiley & Sons.

== Business activities ==
=== 3D Printing ===
Linder is founder and CEO of Tethon3D, a privately held company based in Omaha, Nebraska that develops materials for ceramic 3D printing and provides modeling, scanning and printing services. Notable projects include producing ceramic materials for artificial reef ecosystems, unique construction materials, and a ceramic resin composite for use in stereolithography 3D printing.

=== Entrepreneurship ===
In 2012, she founded Linspiration, Inc., a consulting service to mentor and educate entrepreneurs. This activity was folded into Linseed Capital, a company she co-founded, that now has provided support to more than 20 portfolio companies in the Midwest. She was a co-founder of the Pipeline Entrepreneurship Fellowship, a three-state organization which provides intensive mentoring to entrepreneurs with high-growth potential. She is a board member of the Nebraska Angels, and of SkyVu Entertainment a leading mobile gaming company. and board advisor to Flywheel, a web design and hosting company.

== Books and communications ==
Linder is author of The Women of Berkshire Hathaway, published in 2012, which examines broad trends of women in corporate America and looks at case studies within Berkshire Hathaway, a company once dominated by men. She notes that although women continue to lag far behind men as CEOs and board members, there has been a marked increase in recent years in the number of female business leaders in the United States. Linder has written and edited numerous scientific articles, chapters and books. She was founding editor of the Journal of Cytotechnology, and is a past president of the American Society for Cytotechnology.

Linder mentors the leaders of numerous companies, and advises on approaches to secure angel funding. She frequently lectures on the subject of increasing the business leadership roles of women, and has been a speaker for programs sponsored by the U.S. Small Business Administration.

== Community service ==
Linder has worked on various arts and educational organizations, including the Nebraska Cultural Endowment, and the KANEKO, a leading cultural center in Omaha. In June 2014 she was elected to the board of governors of Nebraska Wesleyan University. She is also an accomplished artist, and her paintings and sculptors feature contemporary landscapes and unique floral patterns, housed in more than 100 institutional and private collections.

== Awards, personal and family ==
In 2013, she was recognized as “Investor of the Year” in the Midwest. In 2014 Linder and her husband received the Entrepreneurial Leadership Award for their work in supporting new companies in Kansas, Missouri and Nebraska. In June 2014, Linder was one of ten women honored by the Women's Center for Advancement for her work, achievements and lifelong commitment to helping women and children stay safe. The same year Linder was recognized by the Omaha Magazine as a “Renaissance Women” because of her diverse contributions to business, science and the arts In 2020, she was inducted into the Omaha Business Hall of Fame. She is married to James Linder, M.D., a physician and business executive.
