= Rudy Smith =

Rudy Smith (January 6, 1945 – December 5, 2019) was an American journalist and photographer known for his contributions to documenting life in Nebraska, particularly within the black community. He was the first black graduate of the University of Nebraska at Omaha's communications school and later became its first black faculty member. He had a 45-year career at the Omaha World-Herald, where he was its first black photographer. Through his photojournalism, he showed everyday life in Omaha while also being an advocate for civil rights.

== Early life and education ==
Rudy Smith was born on January 6, 1945, in Philadelphia, Pennsylvania, in a broom closet in a hospital. His mother, Lovely, had moved from Jim Crow Georgia to Philadelphia during World War II.

Lovely moved the family to Omaha in 1951. Rudy has lived in Omaha since age 6. With seven siblings, he lived in a small house on 19th and Paul Street. He attended Central High School in Omaha and graduated in 1963. Rudy at age twelve became a paperboy for Omaha's African- American weekly newspaper, the Omaha Star. During this time, he formed a close bond with the newspaper's founder, Mildred D. Brown. In 1969, Rudy received his BA degree in journalism from the University of Nebraska at Omaha. As a student, Rudy, alongside NAACP Youth Council President Patti Murrell, demanded transparency from Mayor A. W. Sorensen on police use of chemical spray and riot guns during Omaha disturbances. Rudy led efforts as an NAACP Youth Council leader and student senate member to establish a black studies department at Omaha, which was established in 1971.

Rudy met Llana Jones in high school. Rudy and Llana married in 1967. They had three children: Rudy Jr., Shannon and Quiana.

== Career ==
Rudy Smith joined the Omaha World-Herald in 1963, where he worked for 45 years, until his retirement in 2008. He photographed news events and diverse subjects, from sports to politics to music. In 1968, he covered Robert Kennedy's visit to North Omaha. But he is best known for his coverage of the civil rights movement in Omaha, including protests, riots and marches. He also photographed famous musicians such as Gladys Knight, B.B.King, Calvin Keys, Lois "Lady Mac" McMorris, Wali Ali, Eugene "Booker" McDaniels. In 1971, he put together a collection called "Black is Me," which was featured in the Omaha World-Herald. Rudy also teamed up with writer Harold Cowan to bring attention to poverty in Omaha.

Rudy served on the board of directors for the Great Plains Black History Museum as the board president from 2015 to 2019. Rudy is a long-time member of Salem Baptist Church; he helped launch a retirement home and the Salem Food Pantry.

His photos appeared in national publications like Newsweek, Time, Look, Ebony, and Sports Illustrated. He died at age 74 in Omaha in 2019.
