= James Milliken (academic administrator) =

American academic administrator (born 1957)

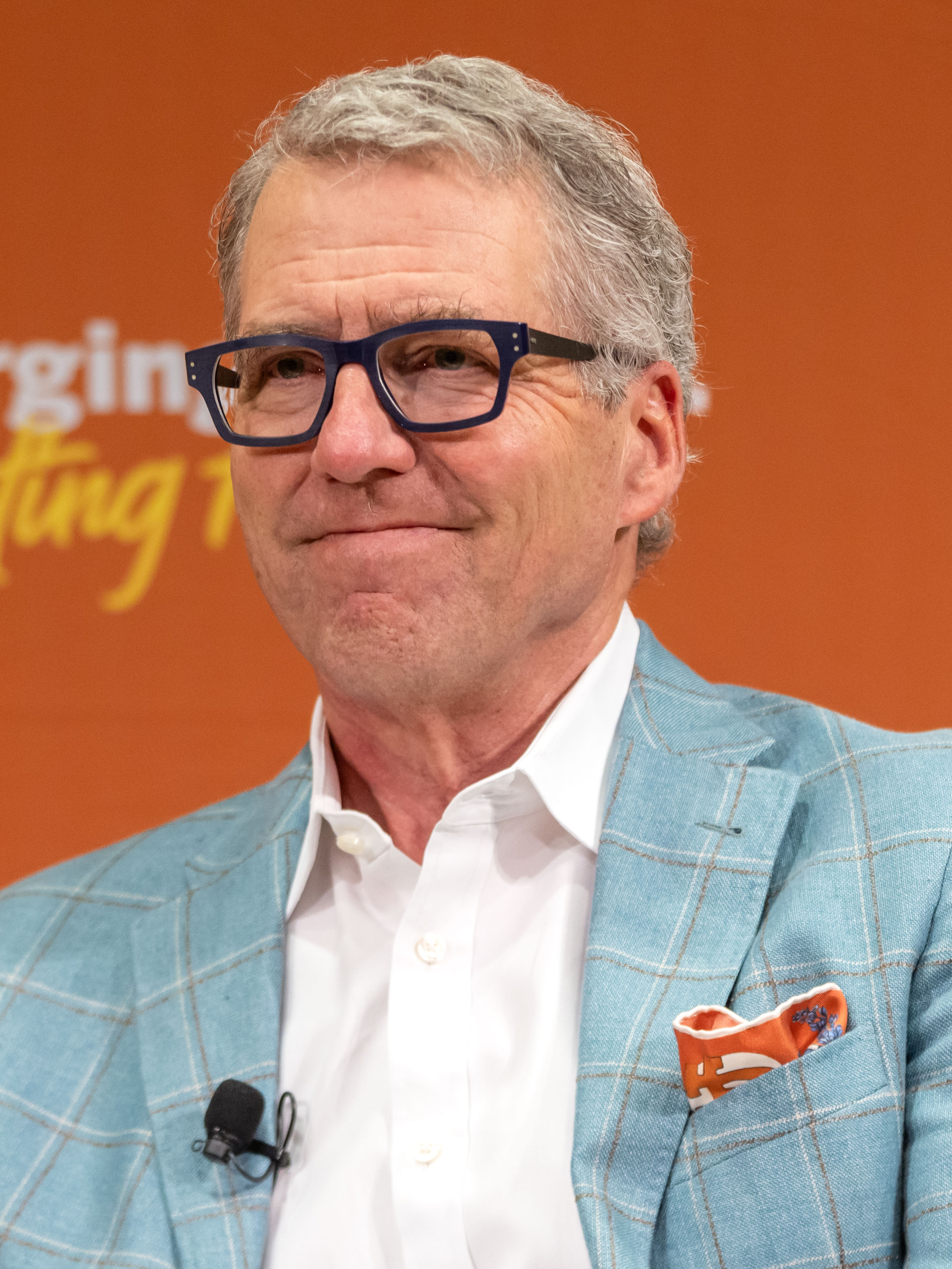
- Milliken in 2024

22nd President of the University of California
- Incumbent
- Assumed office August 1, 2025
- Preceded by: Michael V. Drake

12th Chancellor of the University of Texas System
- In office September 17, 2018 – May 30, 2025
- Preceded by: William H. McRaven
- Succeeded by: John Zerwas

7th Chancellor of the City University of New York
- In office June 1, 2014 – May 31, 2018
- Preceded by: Matthew Goldstein
- Succeeded by: Felix V. Matos Rodriguez

6th President of the University of Nebraska system
- In office August 1, 2004 – May 31, 2014
- Preceded by: L. Dennis Smith
- Succeeded by: Hank M. Bounds

Personal details
- Born: James Bennett Milliken; 1957 (age 68–69) Fremont, Nebraska, U.S.
- Spouse: Nana Graves Hilliard Smith
- Education: University of Nebraska–Lincoln (BA); New York University (JD)

James Bennett Milliken (born 1957) is an American academic administrator and former lawyer, currently serving as the 22nd president of the University of California system since August 2025.

Milliken served as the 12th chancellor of the University of Texas system from September 2018 to May 2025, as the 7th chancellor of the City University of New York system from June 2014 to May 2018, as the 6th president of the University of Nebraska system from 2004 to 2014, and as senior vice president at the University of North Carolina system from 1998 to 2004. Before his academic administration career, Milliken practiced law in New York City from 1983 to 1988.

== Early life and education ==
Milliken was raised in Fremont, Nebraska. His father and grandfather both served as president of the Fremont National Bank.

Milliken received a Bachelor of Arts degree in 1979 from the University of Nebraska–Lincoln. He was a member of Phi Beta Kappa and of the Phi Delta Theta fraternity. After graduation, he spent a year working in Washington, D.C. as legislative assistant to Congresswoman Virginia D. Smith, R-Neb, who represented Nebraska's 3rd congressional district from 1975 to 1991.

Milliken received a Juris Doctor degree in 1983 from the New York University School of Law. He was a Root-Tilden Scholar and research assistant to Professor Norman Dorsen, then-president of the American Civil Liberties Union. After graduation, he worked for the Legal Aid Society's civil division in New York City, then as an attorney at Cadwalader, Wickersham & Taft.

== Academic administration career ==
Milliken returned to his native Nebraska in 1988, where he accepted the position of executive assistant to the president of the University of Nebraska, and he was subsequently appointed secretary to the Board of Regents and vice president for external affairs.

In 1998, Milliken was appointed by Molly Corbett Broad, then-president of the University of North Carolina, to lead university-wide strategy, institutional research, state and federal relations, public affairs, and economic development. In 2000, Milliken helped pass a statewide referendum for a $3.1 billion bond issue for university and community college facilities.

Milliken was appointed president of the University of Nebraska in 2004. He worked to expand access and launched CollegeBound Nebraska, which provided free tuition to Nebraska Pell Grant recipients, University of Nebraska Online Worldwide, and Nebraska Innovation Campus, a public-private research and development park located on the former state fair grounds next to the University of Nebraska–Lincoln campus. He subsequently led a $1.8 billion capital campaign, funding new institutes for early childhood (Buffett Early Childhood Institute), global food and water sustainability (Daugherty Water for Food Global Institute) and rural sustainability (Rural Futures Institute). Milliken also helped lead the Nebraska P-16 Initiative to improve primary education and increase college preparation. He expanded the university's global reach, establishing new programs, with universities, the private sector and government, in China, India, Brazil and Turkey.

=== City University of New York ===
Milliken became Chancellor of the City University of New York in 2014, and held the position through 2018.

While at CUNY, Milliken was lauded for improving access to higher education and expanded an initiative called ASAP, or Accelerated Study in Associate Programs, that provided financial help, including free MetroCard fare, and tutors. CUNY's graduation rates climbed and gained national recognition for the ASAP program.

In November 2016, an interim report of an investigation conducted by the office of New York State Inspector General found "financial waste and abuse", citing shoddy oversight and mismanagement that created a system ripe for financial waste and abuse, and criticized Milliken and CUNY General Counsel Frederick Schaffer, among others. The 2016 report was based on findings that pre-dated Milliken's time as chancellor of CUNY and a group of New York city council members suggested New York State Governor Andrew Cuomo was using the report to politicize the system. During the year preceding Milliken's resignation due to health concerns, Cuomo replaced CUNY Board of Trustees chairman Benno C. Schmidt Jr. with a new chairman Bill Thompson, and nearly all of the members of CUNY's board of trustees with a new politically prominent bloc.

=== University of Texas ===
Millken served as the 12th chancellor of the University of Texas System from September 2018 to May 2025. When he was announced as chancellor, the University of Texas System Board of Regents touted Milliken's rich higher education experience over three decades and his track record of success in creating and executing strategic plans.

In a radio interview with KUT in October, 2022, Milliken announced that the UT System had exceeded enrollment of 244,000 students, system-wide, for the first time in history. Milliken credited the system's enrollment growth to improved access through the UT Regents' Promise Plus endowment. Promise Plus launched in 2022 as a $300 million endowment that was created by the UT System regents to reduce the cost of higher education for lower income students. In 2024, Milliken and the regents expanded this need-based financial aid program to provide free tuition at any of UT’s nine academic institutions for in-state undergraduate students whose families have an adjusted gross income of $100,000 or less.

Under the chancellorship of Millken at the University of Texas System, the board of regents also invested in student well-being, approving a $16.5 million investment to "expand and improve student mental health services, student safety and alcohol education resources" at UT's 13 institutions. Milliken also prioritized workforce development at UT and oversaw the launch of the nation’s most comprehensive industry-recognized microcredential program in higher education, offering free access to more than 45 professional certificates for students, faculty, staff and alumni across all UT institutions.

=== University of California ===
Effective July 31, 2025, Milliken became the 22nd president of the University of California, succeeding Michael V. Drake. The University of California Board of Regents announced the decision on May 2, 2025. He is the second University of Texas System chancellor to be recruited to become the next UC president, after Mark Yudof.

== Social engagement ==
In 2023, Milliken was elected to the American Academy of Arts and Sciences for his professional accomplishments in leadership, policy and communications. Milliken is a member of the Council on Foreign Relations, Business Higher Education Forum, and on the executive committee of the Council on Competitiveness. He formerly served as a director on the board of the Association of Public and Land-grant Universities (APLU), and led the Commission on Innovation, Competition and Economic Prosperity.

== Personal life ==
Since 1989, Milliken has been married to Nana Graves Hilliard Smith, a graduate of Yale University and New York University School of Law who also worked as an associate at the Cadwalader law firm. They have three grown children.

== See also ==
- List of Phi Delta Theta members
