= Jave Yoshimoto =

Japanese-American painter

Jave Gakumei Yoshimoto (吉本学鳴 ジェイブ)
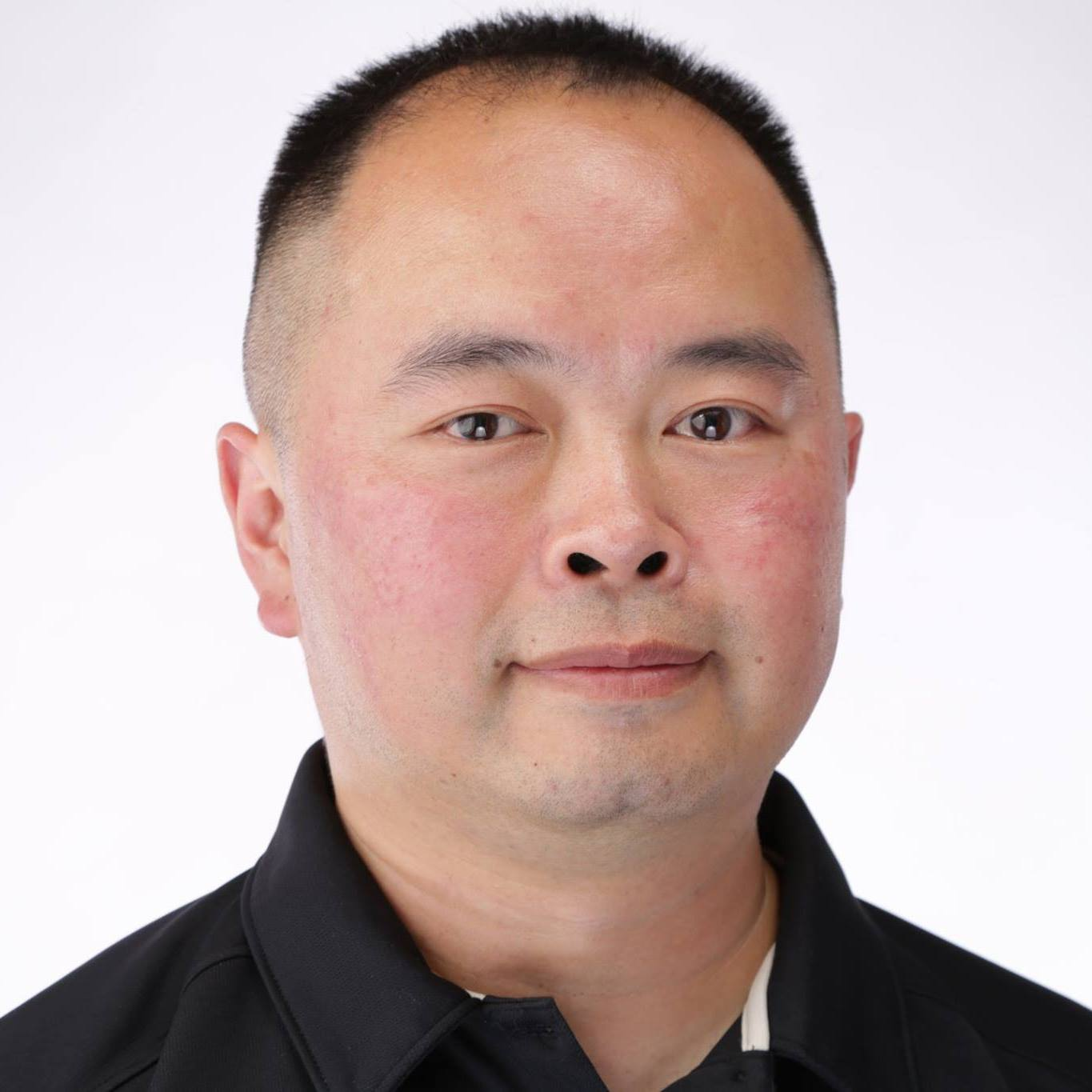
- Yoshimoto, 2017
- Born: September 17, 1974 (age 52); Tokyo, Japan
- Known for: painting
- Notable work: Harbinger of Late Winter Day’s Dusk (2012), In a New York Minute (2013),
- Movement: Contemporary art
- Website: http://www.javeyoshimoto.com

Jave Gakumei Yoshimoto is an American painter.

== Early life and education ==
Jave Yoshimoto was born in Tokyo, Japan on September 17, 1974. His parents are Chinese and he immigrated to California when he was nine years old. He has lived all over the United States and received his Bachelors of Art in Studio Art from the University of California Santa Barbara in 2004. He received a Masters of Art in Art Therapy in 2007 and he has also received a Post-baccalaureate Certificate in Painting and Drawing in 2008 at the School of the Art Institute of Chicago. He then received a Masters of Fine Arts in Painting at Syracuse University in 2012.

== Career ==
Yoshimoto worked as an art therapist in Chicago, Illinois in 2008. He has been an Artist in Residence in a number of different states since 2010. These include Nebraska, New York, Oregon, Vermont, and Wyoming. Yoshimoto was a Graduate Instructor in drawing and painting at Syracuse University from 2010 to 2012. He worked as a teaching artist for Arts Corps in Seattle Public Schools before moving on to work as the Director of Studio Art, and Assistant Professor of Art at Northwestern Oklahoma State University from 2013-2015. In 2015, Yoshimoto accepted the position as an Assistant Professor of Art and the Foundations Coordinator at the University of Nebraska at Omaha. In 2015, he was nominated and received the Joan Mitchell Foundation's Painters and Sculptors grant, and is currently an artist fellow at Tulsa Artist Fellowship in 2017. Since 2012, Yoshimoto has exhibited in 115 national and international exhibitions and 16 solo exhibitions as of 2017.

== Work ==
Yoshimoto works primarily as a painter, but also uses a variety of other two dimensional mediums. Although born in Japan, both of his parents are of Chinese descent-his father from Hong Kong and his mother from Taipei- before he moved to San Francisco, California when Yoshimoto was 9 years of age with his mother. His artwork is heavily influenced by all of the places he has resided in the United States.

Refugees

- Yoshimoto created this body of work to highlight the refugee crisis in Greece from 2015 to present. In the summer of 2016, Yoshimoto travelled to the Skala Sykamineas village on Lesvos Islands in Greece to volunteer with Lighthouse Relief, led arts based workshops at PIKPA camp and interviewed Refugees to learn and document their narratives.

Disaster

- Yoshimoto created this series based on the aftermath of disasters; both manmade and natural. He paints his subject matters using large color field areas to bring awareness to the human suffering that lingers to this day. Images of his artistic process and artwork can be seen in a 2012 New American Painting article and on Art Works for Change. He started this series in response to the Japan earthquake in 2011 which triggered tsunamis and fires and caused thousands of people to lose their lives or livelihoods. Yoshimoto has used this series to memorialize victims and to help raise money for Tsunami survivors.

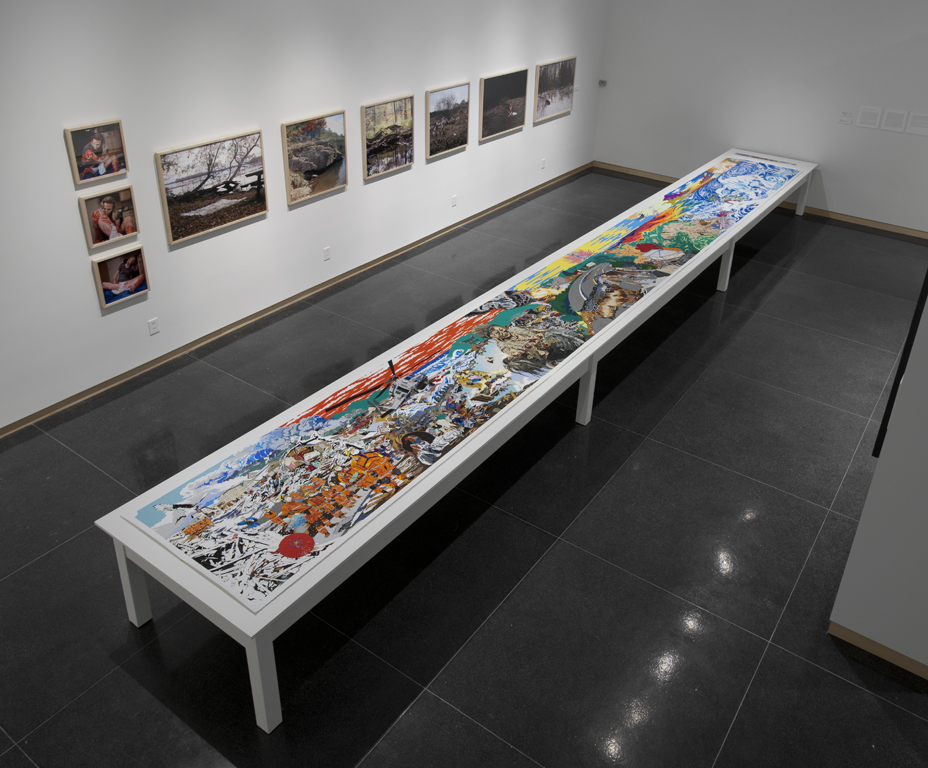
"Baptism of concrete estuary," gouache on paper 42"x366", 2012

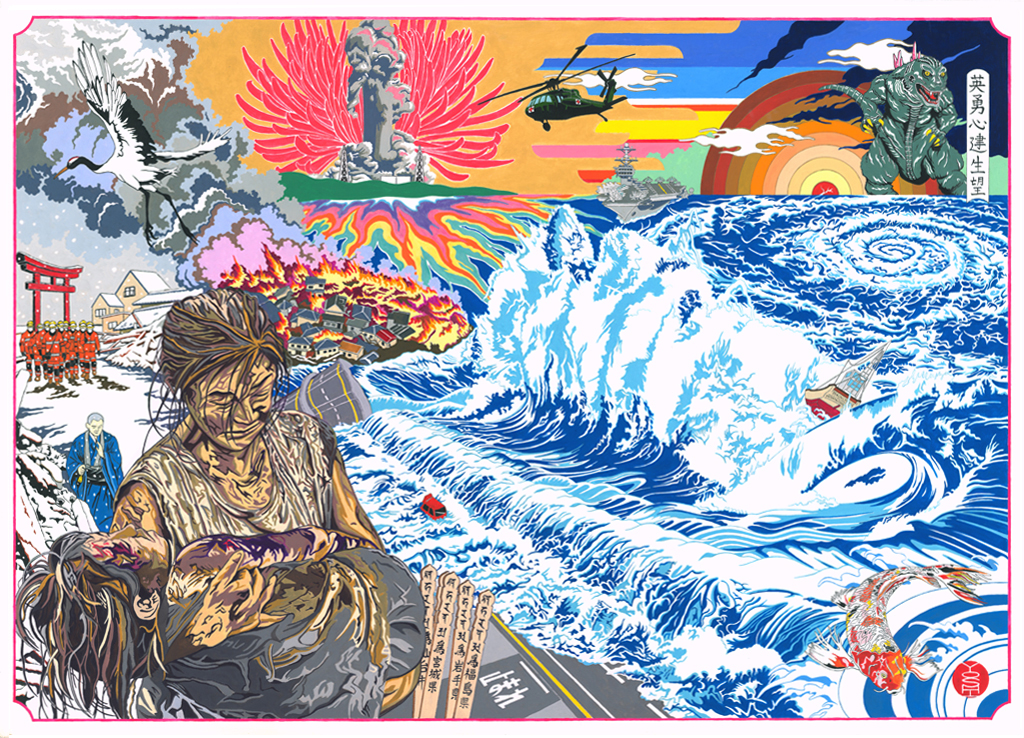
"Harbinger of late winter day's dusk," gouache on paper, 30"x41", 2012.

Godzilla Invading

- Yoshimoto created this series to speak on his feeling of isolation and displacement he often experiences living in the various locations around the U.S. He drew heavy influence from watching Godzilla movies as a child when he lived in Japan, seeing Godzilla as the loneliest creature in the world. The aesthetics in this body of work was influenced by Japanese woodblock prints along with Chinese brush painting to pay homage to his cultural heritage.

Horses of Honor Omaha

- Yoshimoto was commissioned to work on the public painting on a horse sculpture as part of a nationwide campaign to honor police officers who had fallen or severely injured in the line of duty in Omaha.

== Personal life ==
Yoshimoto currently resides in Omaha, Nebraska and Tulsa, Oklahoma.

== Awards ==
- Syracuse University, 2011;
- Chancellor's Award, Friends of the United Nations, New York, 2012;
- Early Avitt Award- Prairie Schooner, University of Nebraska Press Letter of Artistic Achievement, Community Supported Arts, Seattle, 2013;
- Featured Artist, New Emerging Artists, New York, 2013; Featured Artist, Japanesque Exhibit, Overland Gallery, Kinston, NC, 2014;
- First Place, Alabama National, University of Alabama, Tuscaloosa, AL, 2014;
- Second Place, ARTSPACE Gallery, Stroudsburg, PA, 2015;
- Printmaking Award, Joan Mitchell Foundation Painters and Sculptors Grant, 2015;
- On Paper International Printmaking award, 2016
