= Lance C. Pérez =

American electrical engineer and academic administrator

Lance C. Pérez is an American electrical engineer and academic administrator.

Pérez was raised near Washington, D. C., and studied electrical engineering at the University of Virginia. He later enrolled at the University of Notre Dame, earning a Master of Science and PhD. Pérez began teaching at the University of Nebraska in 1996. From 2010 to 2016, Pérez was associate vice chancellor for academic affairs and head of graduate studies. In 2016, Pérez became interim dean of the College of Engineering, after Timothy Wei stepped down. Pérez was formally appointed dean in May 2018. Pérez became the first named dean of engineering at Nebraska when the position was endowed by and named for Fred Hunzeker in 2023. Concurrently with the full-time and endowed periods of his deanship, Pérez holds the Omar H. Heins Professorship of Electrical and Computer Engineering.

Pérez is a 2017 fellow of the American Society for Engineering Education. He was elected a fellow of the Association for the Advancement of Science in 2025.
