= Félix V. Matos Rodríguez =

American academic administrator

Félix Matos Rodríguez
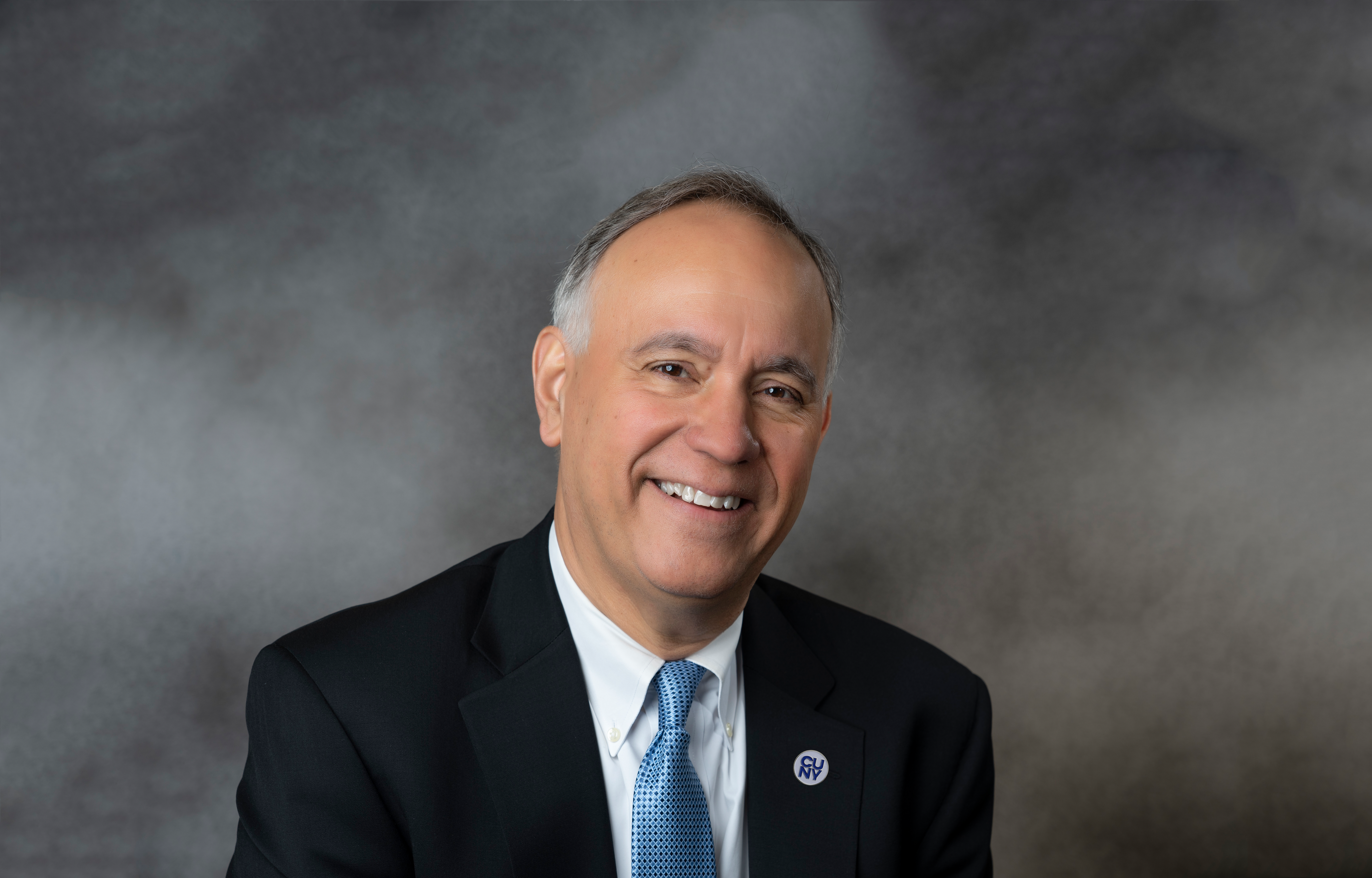

8th Chancellor of the City University of New York
- Incumbent
- Assumed office May 1, 2019
- Preceded by: James Milliken

Personal details
- Born: San Juan, Puerto Rico
- Education: Yale University (BA); Columbia University (MA, PhD)

Félix V. Matos Rodríguez is a Puerto Rican academic administrator, currently the eighth Chancellor of The City University of New York (CUNY), the largest urban public university system in the United States. A historian, professor, and Puerto Rican scholar and writer, Matos Rodríguez previously served as president of two CUNY colleges and as a cabinet secretary of the Puerto Rico Department of Family Affairs. He assumed the post of Chancellor of CUNY on May 1, 2019, becoming the first Hispanic to lead the university.

== Early life and education ==
Matos Rodríguez was born and raised in San Juan, Puerto Rico. His mother, Marta, was a high school Spanish teacher and his father, Félix, was an engineer. He grew up with two brothers, grandparents and great-grandparents and graduated from Colegio San Ignacio in San Juan. Matos Rodriguez earned a bachelor's degree in Latin American studies from Yale University, graduating cum laude. He later earned a doctorate in history at Columbia University.

== Teaching and research ==
Matos Rodríguez began his career with teaching positions at Northeastern University, Boston College and the Interamerican University of Puerto Rico, Metropolitan Campus in Puerto Rico. At the same time, he began a research career focusing on the history of women in Puerto Rico and the Caribbean, Latino studies and migration.

In 2000, Matos Rodríguez joined CUNY's Hunter College as a professor of Black and Puerto Rican/Latino Studies and served as the director of the Center for Puerto Rican Studies. The center is the only university-based research institute devoted to the interdisciplinary study of the Puerto Rican experience in the United States and houses one of the country's oldest and largest Latino research archives. Matos Rodríguez has published numerous books and peer-reviewed journal articles on Puerto Rican history and culture, including a volume that examined Puerto Ricans in New York City in the first half of the 20th century. He received the Albert J. Beveridge Award of the American Historical Association.

== Government of Puerto Rico ==
In 2005, Matos Rodríguez took a leave from CUNY to go home to Puerto Rico for a job as chief adviser to the governor on health and social welfare issues. A year later, he was named Cabinet Secretary of the Department of Family Services, a post in which he managed an annual budget of $2.3 billion and oversaw nearly 11,000 employees across 104 regional offices.

Matos Rodriguez returned to New York and CUNY in 2009 to become president of Hostos Community College. Under Matos Rodríguez's leadership, Hostos made gains in both retention and graduation rates. The improvements helped make the college one of 10 national finalists for the Aspen Prize for Community College Excellence in 2015.

His success at Hostos led to Matos Rodríguez's appointment as president of Queens College, one of CUNY's 11 senior colleges, in 2014. At Queens, he was credited with advancing CUNY's mission of providing access to quality education for students who come from backgrounds traditionally not well served by institutions of higher education. A 2016 study by the Equality of Opportunity Project ranked Queens College in the top 1 percent of all colleges in moving students from the bottom fifth to the top fifth of the country's income distribution. In August 2018, The Chronicle of Higher Education ranked the school 11th of all U.S. colleges for upward social and economic mobility. Increasing diversity among faculty and senior administrative staff was another key element of Matos Rodríguez's tenure at Queens. Under his presidential hiring initiative, nearly 65 percent of new faculty hires came from underrepresented groups.

== Chancellor of CUNY ==
On February 13, 2019, the City University of New York Board of Trustees voted to appoint Matos Rodríguez as the university's eighth Chancellor. Taking office on May 1, 2019, he became the first Latino to head the university in its 172-year history. Early in his tenure, Matos Rodriguez appointed several people of color to high-level positions in CUNY's central administration, including José Luis Cruz as executive vice chancellor and university provost and Hector Batista as executive vice chancellor and chief operating officer.

At the same time, four adjunct professors, two of whom taught at Brooklyn College and were active on the campus Palestine movement, were fired under Chancellor Rodríguez in June 2025. The latter testified to the House Higher Education and Workforce Development committee the teachers violated the institution's "policy on antisemitism." One teacher responded by saying "I'm Jewish. I'm not engaged in antisemitic acts. I'm engaged in protest against genocide." A rally in support of the four on July 31, 2025 drew 150 staff, faculty, local politicians and other supporters in the rain.

== Memberships and associations ==
Matos Rodríguez became an Aspen Institute Ascend Fellow in 2015. He is a member of the Council on Foreign Relations, a member of the Governing Board of the Hispanic Association of Colleges and Universities and its chair for 2018–19, and the editorial board of Liberal Education, a publication of the Association of American Colleges and Universities (AAC&U). In 2023 Matos Rodríguez was elected to the American Academy of Arts & Sciences.

== Awards and accolades ==
- 2019, Distinguished Leader in Education, Education Update
- 2019, Gala Honoree, National Puerto Rican Day Parade
- 2018, Hispanic Heritage Award from the Queens District Attorney's Office
- 2013, Higher Education Leadership Award from the Bronx Chamber of Commerce
- 2013, Hispanic Heritage Achievement Award from the New York Police Department
- 2012, Grand Marshall of the National Puerto Rican Day Parade in New York City
- 2012, Aspira of New York Circle of Achievers Award
- 2012, TrendSetter Award from Latino Trends Magazine
- 2011, Effective Leadership Award by the Latino Center on Aging
- 2011, Academic Leader of the Year Award by the Association of Hispanic Healthcare Executives (AHHE)
- 2009, "Man of the Year" by the New York City League of Puerto Rican Women
- 2009, El Diario/La Prensa "EL Award"
- 2009, “Educator of the Year" by the National Dominican Roundtable
- 2003, Recognition by New York State Senate and Assembly's Puerto Rican/Latino Caucus
- 2003, Special recognition for Hispanic Heritage Month by New York City Council
- 2002, Recognition by National Hispanic Chamber of Commerce

== Publications ==
- Rodríguez, Félix Matos. “$46,432 vs. $372 -- Community Colleges and Philanthropic Support.” HuffPost. July 28, 2013. https://www.huffpost.com/entry/46432-vs-372-community-co_b_3346305.
- Rodríguez, Félix Matos. “Celebrating 45 Years of Hostos Community College.” HuffPost. June 23, 2013. https://www.huffpost.com/entry/hostos-community-college_b_3139172.
- Haslip-Vieira, Gabriel, Angelo Falcón, Félix Matos Rodríguez. Boricuas in Gotham: Puerto Ricans in the Making of Modern New York City. Princeton, NJ: Markus Wiener, 2005.
- Rodríguez, Félix Matos. Editor. A Nation of Women: An Early Feminist Speaks Out / Mi Opinión Sobre Las Libertades, Derechos Y Deberes De La Mujer. By Luisa Capetillo. Houston, TX: Arte Publico Press, 2005.
- Gutmann, Matthew C. Perspectives on Las Américas: A Reader in Culture, History, & Representation. Edited by Félix Matos Rodríguez, Lynn Stephen, and Patricia Zavella. Hoboken, NJ: Wiley-Blackwell, 2003.
- Rodríguez, Félix Matos and Pedro Juan Hernández. Pioneros: Puerto Ricans in New York City 1896–1948. Charleston, SC: Arcadia Publishing, 2001.
- Rodríguez, Félix Matos. Women and Urban Change in San Juan, Puerto Rico, 1820–1868. Gainesville, FL: University Press of Florida, 1999.
- Rodríguez, Félix Matos and Linda C. Delgado. Puerto Rican Women's History: New Perspectives. Abingdon-on-Thames, United Kingdom: Routledge, 1998.

== See also ==
- List of Puerto Ricans
