= Firefly (supercomputer) =

Computer cluster at the University of Nebraska

Firefly logo

The Firefly computer is a high-performance computer cluster housed at the Holland Computing Center located inside of the Peter Kiewit Institute at the University of Nebraska Omaha.

== Specifications ==
The system runs on 1,151 compute nodes, 871 have quad-core AMD Opteron processors and 280 have dual quad-core processors. All have eight gigabytes of memory. Each node is connected to a high-speed, low-latency InfiniBand fabric.

The supercomputer ranked 43 of 500 in the Top 500 Supercomputing Sites list in November 2007 but has since dropped out of the top 500 since the center's rating was not updated after upgrades.
