= Ravi V. Bellamkonda =

Indian-American biomedical engineer

Ravi Bellamkonda
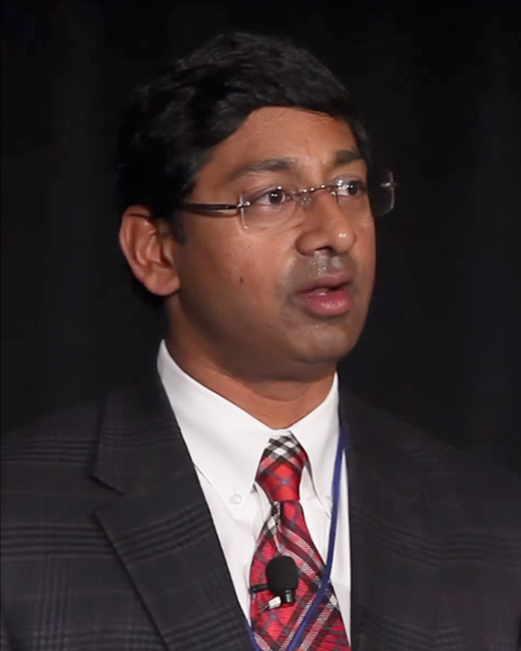

18th President of The Ohio State University
- Incumbent
- Assumed office March 12, 2026
- Preceded by: Ted Carter

Personal details
- Born: Ravi Venkat Bellamkonda; March 1968 (age 58) Telangana, India
- Spouse: Lalita Kaligotla
- Education: Osmania University (BEng); Brown University (MS, PhD)

Ravi Venkat Bellamkonda (born 1968) is an Indian-American biomedical engineer and academic administrator. He was appointed as the 18th president of Ohio State University on March 12, 2026, following his term as provost and executive vice president for academic affairs.

Bellamkonda served as president of the American Institute for Medical and Biological Engineering (AIMBE) for the 2014-2016 term. He has served as a member of the board for the Biomedical Engineering Society (BMES) and is on the editorial board for several scientific journals.

== Education and career ==
Bellamkonda earned his Bachelor of Engineering degree in biomedical engineering at Osmania University in May 1989. He completed his Ph.D. in medical science and biomaterials from Brown University in June 1994. From 1994 to 1995, Bellamkonda was a Markey Post-Doctoral Research Fellow in the Department of Brain and Cognitive Sciences at the Massachusetts Institute of Technology with Jerry Schneider and Sonal Jhaveri.

In 1995, he went on to become the Elmer L. Lindseth Assistant Professor at Case Western Reserve University in Cleveland, Ohio, then advanced to associate professor in 2001.

In 2003, Bellamkonda joined Georgia Tech as an associate professor of biomedical engineering, and in 2005, he was promoted to professor in the Wallace H. Coulter Department of Biomedical Engineering, a joint department created by Emory's School of Medicine and the Georgia Tech College of Engineering.

From 2006 to 2013, he was the Carol Ann and David D. Flanagan Chair in Biomedical Engineering at Georgia Tech. the Carol Ann and David D. Flanagan Chair in Biomedical Engineering and Georgia Cancer Coalition Distinguished Scholar

In 2008, he was named deputy director of research at the Georgia Tech/Emory Center for the Engineering of Living Tissues (GTEC), an NSF funded engineering research center. Afterwards, in 2010, he was named associate vice president for research at the Georgia Institute of Technology, a position he held until 2013.

In 2013, Bellamkonda was named the department chair of the Wallace H. Coulter Department of Biomedical Engineering at Georgia Tech and Emory University. On August 1, 2016, he became Vinik Dean of the Pratt School of Engineering at Duke University.

From July 1, 2021 to December 2024, he served as Provost and Executive Vice President for Academic Affairs at Emory University in Atlanta, Georgia, where he had faculty appointments in the Department of Biology and the Wallace H. Coulter Department of Biomedical Engineering.

Bellamkonda joined Ohio State on January 14, 2025 as executive vice president and provost.

== Research ==
Bellamkonda's primary area of research is the application of biomaterials to the human nervous system, including spinal nerve repair, neural interfaces, and brain tumor therapy.

Bellamkonda's research was the subject of a BBC science report, "Cancer: 'Tumor Monorail' Can Lead Cancers to Their Doom" He was also the subject of a feature profile in the Britain-based international journal, The Engineer.

== Professional services ==
- Board of directors, Biomedical Engineering Society (2012-2014)
- BMES Fellow, Biomedical Engineering Society
- President, American Institute of Medical and Biological Engineering (AIMBE)
- Vice-president at large, American Institute for Medical and Biological Engineering (2012-2013)
- Board of directors, American Institute for Medical and Biological Engineering
- Charter Member, CSR BNVT Study Section, National Institute of Health
- Member of CREATE-X executive team at Georgia Tech (April 2015)

== Honors, awards, and recognition ==
- Eureka Award, National Cancer Institute, 2010-2014
- Georgia Cancer Coalition Distinguished Scholar
- Global Indus Technovator Award, IBC, Massachusetts Institute of Technology, January 2006
- Elected Fellow, AIMBE, February 2006
- Associate editor, IEEE Transactions on Neural Systems and Rehabilitation Engineering, January 2006
- Elected Fellow, Institute of Physics, September 2004 – Present
- Member of editorial board, Journal of Neural Engineering, September 2003
- Tumor Rail [nanofiber technology], 2014, CBS News, Nature Materials journal
- Clemson Award for Applied Research, 2014, Society for Biomaterials
