= Peter Kiewit Institute =

Engineering research facility at the University of Nebraska

- Peter Kiewit Institute
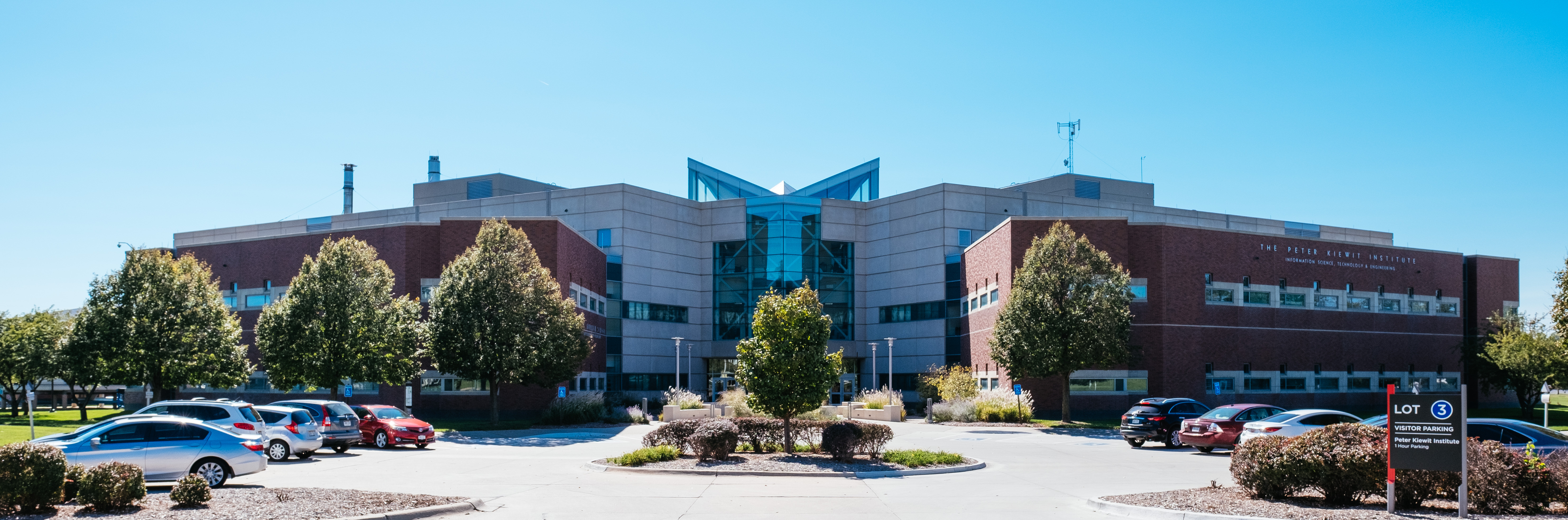
- Type: Professional school
- Established: 1996; 30 years ago
- Parent institution: University of Nebraska–Lincoln
- Affiliations: University of Nebraska
- Location: 1110 S 67th Street, Omaha, Nebraska, United States; 41°14′50″N 96°01′00″W
- Website: pki.nebraska.edu

The Peter Kiewit Institute (PKI) is an engineering teaching and research facility primarily located on the campus of the University of Nebraska Omaha in Omaha, Nebraska. Established in 1996, it is administered by the University of Nebraska–Lincoln College of Engineering in partnership with private-sector companies.

== History ==
In the mid-1960s, the University of Nebraska absorbed the Municipal College of Omaha to create the University of Nebraska system. Though the universities are administered separately, the engineering programs of both schools were merged in 1970 under the auspices of the Lincoln campus.

The combined program founded the Peter Kiewit Institute in 1996, with the majority of its initial $70-million grant coming from private-sector investment. Construction of a 192,000-square-foot building to house the institute on the Scott Engineering Campus (approximately a half-mile south of Omaha's main campus) cost $37 million, and the remainder was used to establish an endowment fund. It was dedicated in honor of Peter Kiewit, co-founder of the Kiewit Corporation whose foundation donated significantly to the new institute.

PKI states that its goal is "to help meet the needs of the nation's technology and engineering firms by providing a top-flight education to students interested in pursuing careers in information science, technology and engineering." The institute houses the Omaha branch of the Holland Computing Center and the Firefly computer cluster, and provides facilities for the Charles W. Durham School of Architectural Engineering and Construction, which was established in 2005 and is recognized as one of the top programs of its kind in the United States.

In 2024, the university began exploring a significant expansion of PKI, in terms of both enrollment and available academic space.

== Colleges and degrees ==
PKI offers degree programs in both Lincoln and Omaha. Approximately one-third of NU's engineering students take at least a portion of their credit hours through the Peter Kiewit Institute.

College of Engineering (Lincoln)

- Bachelor's degrees: Architectural Engineering, Civil Engineering, Computer Engineering, Construction Engineering, Construction Management, Electrical Engineering

College of Information Science and Technology (Omaha)

- Bachelor's degrees: Bioinformatics, Computer Science, Cybersecurity, IT Innovation, Management Information Systems,
- Master's degrees: Computer Science, Cybersecurity, Management Information Systems
- PhD: Information Technology
