= Hank M. Bounds =

American academic

Hank Bounds

7th President of the University of Nebraska
- In office April 13, 2015 – August 15, 2019
- Preceded by: James Milliken
- Succeeded by: Ted Carter

Personal details
- Born: July 23, 1967 (age 59)
- Education: B.S., University of Southern Mississippi, 1991; M.Ed., University of Southern Mississippi, 1994; Ph.D., University of Mississippi, 2000
- Occupation: Academic administrator

Hank M. Bounds (born 1967) is an American educator and a past president of the University of Nebraska system, where he was the administrator of all campuses in the university. He previously was the commissioner of higher education in Mississippi.

== Early life ==
Bounds grew up on a small farm in rural Mississippi, where his family raised pigs and cows and he hauled hay. His service in the Army National Guard helped him pay for college. Bounds earned his bachelor's degree in Sports Administration and Secondary Education in 1991 and his master's degree in Educational Administration in 1994, both from the University of Southern Mississippi. He earned a doctorate in Educational Leadership from the University of Mississippi in 2000.

== Career ==
Bounds began his career as a high school teacher, then rose to principal and later superintendent before becoming State Superintendent of Education in Mississippi. As chief state school academic officer for Mississippi, he oversaw an annual student enrollment of 495,000 students, an operating budget of more than $4.3 billion, and staff numbering 62,000. In his tenure as state superintendent, Bounds generated more than $49 million in private donations for the Mississippi Department of Education and local school districts. He led the effort to reopen all of the state’s public school districts within six weeks after approximately $1 billion in damage from Hurricane Katrina.

Bounds became Mississippi’s commissioner of higher education in 2009. Together the system enrolled 85,000 students, employed 26,000 faculty and staff, and operated with a combined annual budget of $4.5 billion, including $500 million in research and development. During every year of Bounds’ tenure as commissioner, student enrollment and degrees awarded by the institutions in the Mississippi system increased, by a total of 13.3 percent and 11.4 percent, respectively.

On January 12, 2015, the Board of Regents appointed Bounds as the seventh President of the University of Nebraska. He began his tenure as president on April 13, 2015. One notable occurrence during his tenure was the Turning Point USA incident on the University of Nebraska–Lincoln campus in August 2017, which attracted national debate. Bounds announced his departure from the role of president of the University of Nebraska system on March 25, 2019.
