= University of Nebraska Omaha =

Public university in Omaha, Nebraska, US

- Former names: University of Omaha (1908–1968)
- Type: Public research university
- Established: 1908; 118 years ago
- Parent institution: University of Nebraska system
- Academic affiliations: CUMU; space-grant
- Endowment: $110 million
- Chancellor: Joanne Li
- President: Jeffrey P. Gold
- Faculty: 1,069
- Students: 15,058 (fall 2022)
- Undergraduates: 12,488
- Postgraduates: 3,038
- Location: Omaha, Nebraska, U.S. 41.259°N 96.006°W
- Campus: Large city, 534 acres (216 ha) 78 acres (32 ha) (North Campus) 154 acres (62 ha) (South Campus)
- Colors: Crimson and black
- Nickname: Mavericks
- Sporting affiliations: NCAA Division I – Summit League; NCHC
- Mascot: Durango
- Website: unomaha.edu

The University of Nebraska at Omaha (UNO) is a public research university in Omaha, Nebraska, United States. Founded in 1908 by faculty from the Omaha Presbyterian Theological Seminary as a private non-sectarian college, the university was originally known as the University of Omaha. Originally meant to provide a Christian-based education free from ecclesiastical control, the university served as a strong alternative to the city's many successful religiously-affiliated institutions.

Since the year 2000, the university has more than tripled its student housing and opened a 450-bed student dormitory and academic space on its Scott Campus in 2017. It has also recently constructed modern facilities for its engineering, information technology, business, and biomechanics programs. UNO currently offers more than 200 programs of study across six different colleges, and has over 60 classroom, student, athletic, and research facilities spread across three campuses. It is classified among "R2: Doctoral Universities – High research activity".

The Omaha Mavericks compete in 15 NCAA Division I sports in both the NCHC and Summit League conferences. The ice hockey, basketball, and volleyball teams compete in Baxter Arena on the university's Center Campus. Opened in 2021, Connie Claussen Field is the home of the softball team and the baseball team plays at Tal Anderson Field; both are located at Maverick Park, west of Baxter Arena. UNO enjoyed national attention in 2015, when the hockey team reached the national semifinal (Frozen Four) of the NCAA tournament for the first time.

== History ==
The University of Nebraska Omaha was originally formed in 1908 as the University of Omaha. The university was originally located in the Kountze Place neighborhood of North Omaha and was a private university. The first classes were located in the Redick Mansion, once at North 24th and Pratt Streets, from 1909 through 1917. As the university was established a few blocks north of the Presbyterian Theological Seminary, most of its early faculty were recruited from the Seminary's teachers, as well as the faculty of what was then known as Bellevue College.

In 1931, the University of Omaha became a municipal school following a successful vote by the city. The university later officially changed its name to the Municipal University of Omaha. In 1938, the university moved from its previous North Omaha campus to 60th and Dodge Street in Central Omaha. Following the move, the previous campus was later re-developed. The last two original OU buildings, Jacobs and Joslyn Halls, were demolished in the 1960s for a 12-story Omaha Housing Authority apartment building for the elderly.

The university's current administration building, the Eugene C. Eppley Administration Building, opened in 1956. It was named for Eugene C. Eppley, following a major donation by the Eppley Foundation. In January 1967, it was announced that the University of Omaha would join the University of Nebraska system. An election was held, which later gained approval. The merger was completed on July 1, 1968, and the university officially re-branded to the University of Nebraska at Omaha.

Following the 1990s University of Nebraska Omaha began major expansion to the South campus. In 1999, the university opened the Peter Kiewit Institute in partnership with the University of Nebraska–Lincoln's College of Engineering and Technology. In 2003, the university opened the Scott Village, a residential dormitory development directly South of the Peter Kiewit Institute. The South campus was later re-named to the Scott Campus in 2016, named for Walter Scott Jr.

== Academics and rankings ==
Undergraduate demographics as of fall 2023
Race and ethnicity	Total
White	61%
Hispanic	17%
Black	8%
Asian	5%
Two or more races	5%
International student	3%
Unknown	1%
Economic diversity
Low-income (Note: The percentage of students who received an income-based federal Pell grant intended for low-income students.)	33%
Affluent (Note: The percentage of students who are a part of the American middle class at the bare minimum.)	67%

Academic rankings

National
- U.S. News & World Report: 284
- Washington Monthly: 163

UNO is classified among "R2: Doctoral Universities – High research activity". UNO is the home of the Peter Kiewit Institute a $70 million computer science facility and engineering facility. PKI houses UNO's College of Information Science and Technology, University of Nebraska–Lincoln's College of Engineering and Technology, and the Holland Computing Center, which houses the Firefly supercomputer. The College of Information Science and Technology offers undergraduate/graduate degrees in Computer Science, Management Information Systems, Bioinformatics (graduate degree offered in collaboration with UNMC's Pathology's graduate program), Information Assurance, and Information Technology Innovation. In 2002, UNO became the first university in Nebraska to offer an ABET accredited computer science degree and the only university in the state with an ABET accredited information systems program.

The UNO College of Public Affairs and Community Service (CPACS) comprises eight units and several subunits. The programs are interdisciplinary and work with local, national, and international organizations to make a difference in communities in Nebraska and around the world. As the state's highest-ranked college, it had eight programs ranked in the top 25 in the nation by U.S. News & World Report for 2023. These included #23 (tie) Best Public Affairs Program, #7 (tie) Local Government Management, #11 Nonprofit Management, #5 Public Finance, and #19 Public Management.

Within the many programs offered by CPACS, rankings remain high for the college's popular School of Criminology and Criminal Justice graduate program, ranked 13th nationally. (U.S. News & World Report kept the rankings the same for all criminology programs this year.) The College of Business Administration's Master of Business Administration students ranked in the top 5% nationally, while the undergraduate students ranked in the top 15% on a 2007 standardized exam on business topics conducted by the Educational Testing Service.

== Campus ==
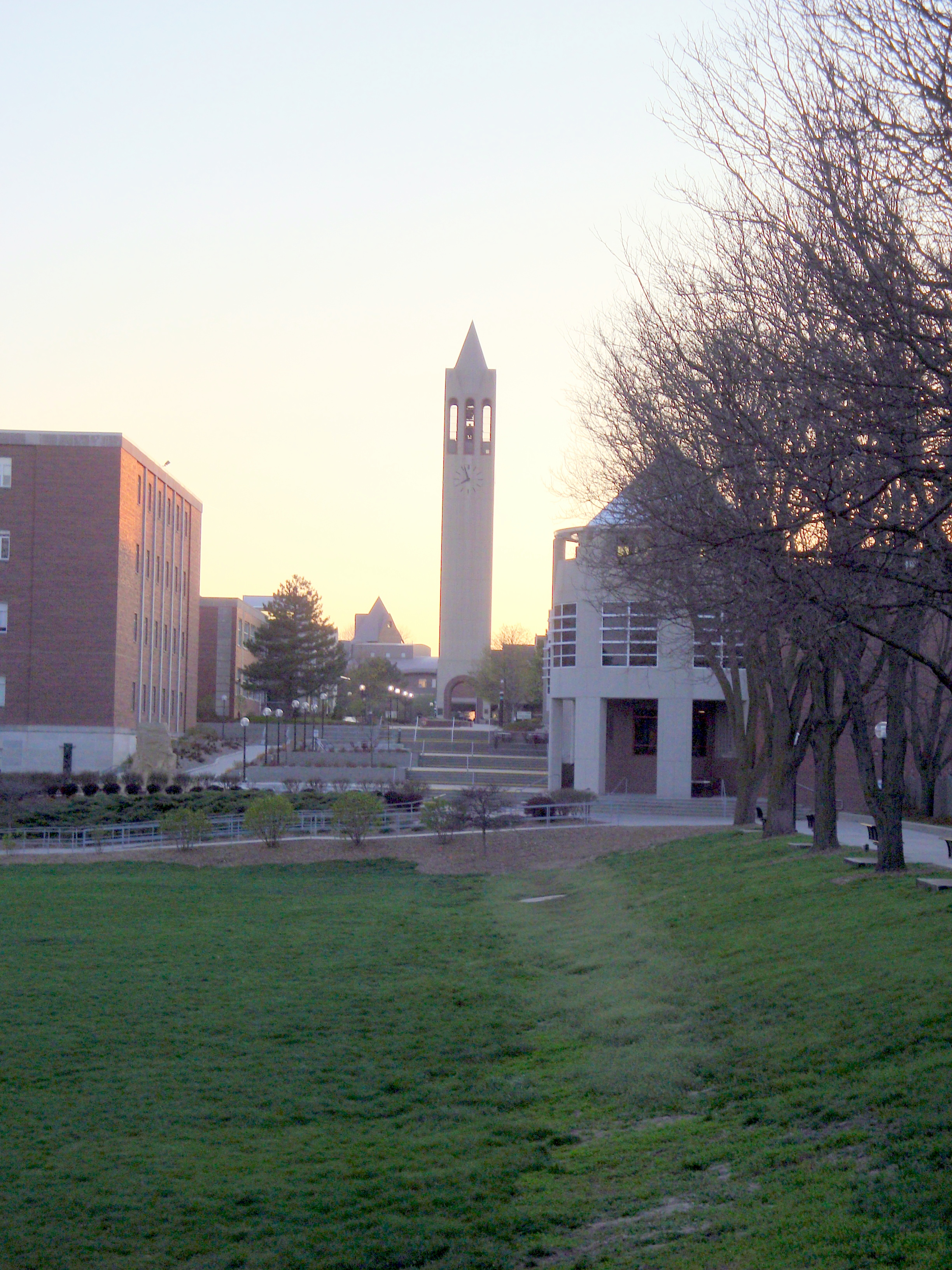
University of Nebraska Omaha Dodge Campus

The University of Nebraska Omaha is located in Central Omaha, Nebraska, United States. The university has two campuses, Dodge Campus and Scott Campus.

=== Dodge Campus ===
Dodge Campus is the largest and primary campus for the University of Nebraska Omaha. Colleges located on the Scott Campus include the College of Arts and Sciences, College of Communication, Fine Arts, and Media, College of Education, College of Public Affairs and Community Service, Graduate Studies, International Studies, and the Service-Learning Academy.Additionally, Dodge Campus is also the home to the Dr. C.C. and Mabel L. Criss Library, the Strauss Performing Arts Center, the UNO Art Gallery, and the Black Box Theater.

The University Village and Maverick Village student housing complexes, each composed of multiple buildings, are spread across the western edge of Dodge Campus, and additional housing is present on Scott Campus. The H&K (Health and Kinesiology) building houses the Athletic Training Department as well as student fitness areas. Attached are the Sapp Field House and Al F. Caniglia Field, where athletics practice. The Pep Bowl is near Caniglia Field.

=== Scott Campus ===
Scott Campus (formerly Pacific Campus) houses the primary facilities for the College of Business Administration and the College of Information Science and Technology, which includes the Peter Kiewit Institute, the Charles W. Durham School of Architectural Engineering, and the Firefly supercomputer. The College of Information Science and Technology houses the only National Security Agency (NSA) designated Center for Academic Excellence in Cyber Operations (CAE-CO) in the State of Nebraska. Furthermore, College of Information Science and Technology has been designated as the NSA Center for Academic Excellence in Cyber Defense (CAE-CD) since 2002 and renewed twice since then. The Scott Technology Center incubator, which aims to assist start-up enterprises, is also located on the Scott Campus. The Scott Data Center and Scott Conference Center are other features of Scott Campus. The campus was renamed in the fall of 2016 to honor Walter Scott Jr.

== Athletics ==
The university's sports teams, branded as "Omaha", have been nicknamed the Mavericks since 1971. In 2011, 13 of the 16 sports that the university then sponsored moved from NCAA Division II to Division I and The Summit League. The exceptions were men's ice hockey, which already competed in Division I; and football and wrestling, both of which UNO dropped. Wrestling had been the school's most successful sport with national championships in 1991, 2004, 2005, 2006, 2009, 2010, and 2011. The state's only Division I ice hockey program, Omaha became a charter member of the National Collegiate Hockey Conference in 2011 with play beginning in the 2013–14 season, following a major conference realignment. Previously, the Mavericks had been in the Western Collegiate Hockey Association since 2010–11. Omaha added teams in men's golf and men's soccer in 2011. Men's sports at UNO include tennis, baseball, basketball, soccer, swimming and diving, golf, and ice hockey. Women's sports include basketball, cross country, golf, soccer, softball, swimming and diving, tennis, track and field, and volleyball. The softball team won the Women's College World Series national championship in 1975 as a member of the Association for Intercollegiate Athletics for Women (AIAW). The volleyball team won the Division II title in 1996, and the women's soccer team won the Division II championship in 2005.

== Media ==
KVNO 90.7 FM is produced and broadcast from UNO's North Campus. The station's format is primarily classical music, although approximately 10% of its broadcast time is devoted to athletic and campus events. MavRadio (HD FM 90.7-2) is a student produced college/indie station also produced and broadcast from UNO's North Campus.

The Gateway, the school's student newspaper, is published bi-weekly during the spring and fall academic semesters.

== Notable Legal Cases ==
Since 2020, the University of Nebraska faced several notable legal cases from students and passed faculty and staff personnel.

=== 2023 ===
==== Seals v. Board of Regents of University of Nebraska, et. al., ====
In 2023, Denisha Seals, sued the University of Nebraska, alleging Title VI violations creating a hostile educational and work environment. She alleged that during her time as a teaching assistant in the English Department at University of Nebraska Omaha, she was subjected to disparaging comments from other students on her race and viability in the program. She also alleged that she was subjected to disparaging comments from her doctoral supervisors in the program.

== Notable people ==
=== Notable alumni ===
- Charles J. Adams, United States Air Force brigadier general
- Karrin Allyson, Grammy Award-winning jazz vocalist
- Josh Archibald, professional hockey player
- Joe Arenas, professional football player
- Shaq Barrett, professional football player who attended Omaha University but did not graduate
- Joshua Becker, minimalist writer
- Erin Belieu, poet
- Bruce Benedict, professional baseball player
- Brian Blankenship, professional football player
- Chris Bober, professional football player
- Steven Kenneth "Destiny" Bonnell II, live streamer and political commentator (did not complete a degree)
- Jason Brilz, retired professional mixed martial artist who fought for the Ultimate Fighting Championship
- Marlin Briscoe, professional football player
- John R. D. Cleland, U.S. Army major general
- Tyler Cloyd, professional baseball player
- Chris Cooper, professional football player
- Abbie Cornett, politician
- Sam Curry, cyber security researcher and entrepreneur
- Russell C. Davis, United States Air Force lieutenant general
- Merlyn Hans Dethlefsen, Medal of Honor recipient
- Roger Donlon, Medal of Honor recipient
- Harold Dow, CBS News correspondent and investigative reporter
- Jake Ellenberger, NCAA All-American wrestler; professional mixed martial artist, Welterweight in the Ultimate Fighting Championship
- Dan Ellis, professional hockey player
- Joseph Berg Esenwein (1867–1946), editor, lecturer and writer
- Dick Fletcher, Emmy Award-winning television meteorologist
- Peter Fonda, actor, writer and director; attended Omaha University, but did not complete his degree
- James W. Fous, Medal of Honor recipient; attended Omaha University, but enlisted in the Army and was killed in action before graduating
- Laurie S. Fulton, attorney and former United States Ambassador to Denmark
- Mike Gabinet, professional hockey player and college hockey coach
- Annunciata Garrotto, soprano
- Jake Guentzel, professional hockey player
- Chuck Hagel, former U.S. senator and U.S. Secretary of Defense
- Paul Henderson, reporter for The Seattle Times, winner of the Pulitzer Prize for Investigative Reporting in 1982
- John Q. Henion, US Army lieutenant general
- John L. Holland, psychologist who developed the Holland Codes
- David C. Jones, United States Air Force general, 9th chairman of the Joint Chiefs of Staff
- James H. Kasler, Korean War Flying ace, only person awarded the Air Force Cross (United States) three times
- Ree Kaneko, artist
- Jeff Koterba, editorial cartoonist, Omaha World Herald
- Rod Kush, professional football player
- James J. Lindsay, United States Army general
- Jaycob Megna, professional hockey player
- Jayson Megna, professional hockey player
- Zach Miller, professional football player
- Jeremy Nordquist, Nebraska state senator
- Conor Oberst, singer-songwriter of Bright Eyes; attended Omaha University, but did not complete his degree
- Scott Parse, professional hockey player
- John L. Piotrowski, United States Air Force general, vice chief of staff of the USAF
- Penny Sackett, astronomer, Chief Scientist of Australia
- Dorothy Hayes Sater, journalist, early television reporter
- Nick Seeler, professional hockey player; attended Omaha University but did not graduate
- Heather A. Smith, nurse and academic administrator
- Rudy Smith, journalist
- Anthony Stolarz, professional hockey player
- Andrej Šustr, professional hockey player
- Leo Thorsness, Medal of Honor recipient
- Jack L. Treadwell, Medal of Honor recipient
- Vicki Trickett, actress
- Leslie J. Westberg, United States Air Force brigadier general
- Colleen Williams, television reporter
- Johnnie E. Wilson, United States Army general
- Phil Wise, professional football player
- James R. Young, former chairman and president of Union Pacific Railroad.
- Greg Zanon, professional hockey player
- Greg Zuerlein, professional football player; attended Omaha University but did not graduate

=== Notable faculty ===
- Chris W. Allen, journalism and communication professor
- Abdul Salam Azimi, former chief justice of Afghanistan
- Jeremy Castro Baguyos, musician-researcher
- Warren Buffett, investor, philanthropist
- Harry Duncan, printer, author, publisher
- Anna Monardo, novelist
- Carey Ryan, psychologist
- Ada-Rhodes Short, interdisciplinary informatics professor
- Nicholas Stergiou, exercise scientist
- Z. Randall Stroope, composer, conductor
- Shaista Wahab, librarian, author
- Mary E. Williamson, WASP, public relations, communications professor
- Jave Yoshimoto, artist

== See also ==
- Chancellor of the University of Nebraska Omaha
- Education in North Omaha, Nebraska
- The Nebraska Review
- Dr. C.C. and Mabel L. Criss Library
