= University of Nebraska system =

Public university system of Nebraska

- Latin: Universitas Nebraskensis
- Motto: Literis Dedicata et Omnibus Artibus
- Motto in English: Dedicated to Letters and All the Arts
- Type: Public university system
- Established: February 15, 1968
- Budget: $2.65 billion (FY 2019)
- President: Jeffrey P. Gold
- Students: 51,835
- Location: Lincoln, Nebraska, U.S.
- Campus: 3 Universities 1 Medical School 1 Agricultural College 1 High School
- Colors: Red and gold
- Website: www.nebraska.edu
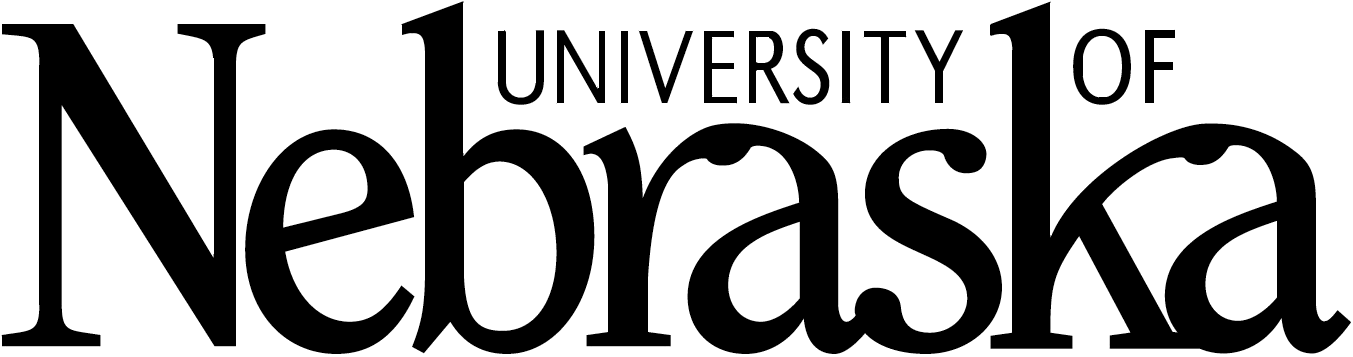

The University of Nebraska system is the public university system of the U.S. state of Nebraska. The system was formed in 1968 from the merger of the University of Nebraska and the University of Omaha. The system has since expanded to include the University of Nebraska at Kearney, Nebraska College of Technical Agriculture, University of Nebraska Medical Center, and an online high school. Its flagship campus is the University of Nebraska–Lincoln.

== History ==
The University of Nebraska system was formed in 1968 from the merger of the University of Nebraska and the University of Omaha. Upon the merger's completion, the system originally included the University of Nebraska–Lincoln, the University of Nebraska at Omaha, and the University of Nebraska Medical Center, which the University of Nebraska–Lincoln had previously acquired in 1902. The system later added the University of Nebraska at Kearney in 1990, and the Nebraska College of Technical Agriculture in 1994.

== Schools ==
Name	Formed	Location	Joined	Type	Athletics	Ref.
University of Nebraska–Lincoln	1869	Lincoln	1968	Research university	Big Ten (NCAA Division I)	
University of Nebraska at Kearney	1905	Kearney	1990	Research university	MIAA (NCAA Division II)	
University of Nebraska Omaha	1908	Omaha	1968	Research university	Summit (NCAA Division I)	
University of Nebraska Medical Center	1880	Omaha	1968	Medical school	—N/a	
Nebraska College of Technical Agriculture	1965	Curtis	1994	Technical college	—N/a	
University of Nebraska High School	1929	Online	2013	Online high school	—N/a	

== Nebraska Institutes ==
The University of Nebraska has four interdisciplinary, University-wide institutes operating across the University of Nebraska system.

- Buffett Early Childhood Institute - Samuel J. Meisels, founding executive director
- National Strategic Research Institute - Robert Hinson, USAF Lt. General (ret.), founding executive director
- Robert B. Daugherty Water for Food Global Institute - Peter G. McCornick, executive director
- Rural Futures Institute - Chuck Schroeder, founding executive director

Two of NU's campuses also partner in the Peter Kiewit Institute, a facility in Omaha, Nebraska that houses academic programs from both the University of Nebraska-Lincoln's College of Engineering and the University of Nebraska at Omaha's College of Information Science and Technology.

== NU Online Education ==
Online Worldwide is the virtual connection point to more than 100 online degrees, certificates, endorsements, and minors offered by the four campuses of the University of Nebraska system. University of Nebraska High School is an accredited, university-based online high school. The online college preparatory curriculum allows students to earn high school credit or a diploma from anywhere around the world.

== Governance ==
University of Nebraska system locations.
Black: Universities; Red: Technical Colleges.

=== Board of Regents ===
The University of Nebraska system is governed by the board of regents, a twelve-member panel consisting of eight voting members and a non-voting student body president from each campus. Voting members are elected by district to six-year terms; elections are held in even-numbered years. The board of regents meets at Varner Hall on East Campus and supervises the operation, expenditures, and tuition rates of each university in the system.

The Board of Regents was established as a constitutional office in the 1875 Nebraska State Constitution. At the time, the regents were elected in partisan statewide elections to six-year terms. In 1917, the legislature made the regental elections nonpartisan, and in 1920, voters ratified a constitutional amendment that provided for the election of the regents by district. The regents were elected from the state's congressional districts from 1923 to 1949, and from the Nebraska Supreme Court districts from 1949 to 1971. Beginning in 1971, the regents were elected in separate districts drawn by the state legislature, which are redrawn after each census. In 1974, voters approved a constitutional amendment that added student members to the board of regents as nonvoting members.

The election is formally nonpartisan, with the party affiliations below reflecting known political history, candidate self-declaration, or state party support.

University of Nebraska Board of Regents
District	Name	Party	Start	Next Election
1	Tim Clare	Republican	January 7, 2009	2026 (retiring)
2	Jack Stark	Republican	January 7, 2021	2026 (retiring)
3	Jim Scheer	Republican	February 3, 2023 (appointed)	2030
4	Joel Makovicka	Republican	February 3, 2026 (appointed)	2026 (special, retiring)
5	Robert Schafer, Chair	Republican	March 26, 2013 (appointed)	2030
6	Paul Kenney, Vice Chair	Republican	January 2017	2028
7	Kathy Wilmot	Republican	January 5, 2023	2028
8	Barbara Weitz	Democratic	January 2019	2030

Student Regents
University	Name
University of Nebraska at Kearney	Sam Schroeder, non-voting
University of Nebraska–Lincoln	Libby Wilkins, non-voting
University of Nebraska Medical Center	Brock Calamari, non-voting
University of Nebraska Omaha	Drew Leisy, non-voting

=== President ===
The president of the University of Nebraska system is appointed by and reports to the board of regents. The position was created in 1968 when the Municipal University of Omaha and the University of Nebraska Medical Center were absorbed into the University of Nebraska to create a state-wide system. Clifford M. Hardin was the first president and Ronald Roskens was the longest-tenured. Jeffrey P. Gold has been serving as Nebraska's president since July 1, 2024.

== See also ==
- Nebraska State College System, the other state institution of higher education
