= List of Nebraska Cornhuskers athletic directors =

Director of Athletics of the University of Nebraska–Lincoln
- Incumbent; Troy Dannen since March 22, 2024
- Reports to: President of the University of Nebraska
- Precursor: Athletic Manager
- Formation: 1920; 106 years ago
- First holder: Fred Luehring
- Salary: $1.7 million

This is a list of athletic directors of the Nebraska Cornhuskers, the intercollegiate athletic teams that represent the University of Nebraska–Lincoln. The university is a member of the Big Ten Conference and competes in NCAA Division I and the Football Bowl Subdivision. Troy Dannen was appointed Nebraska's seventeenth full-time athletic director in 2024.

Nebraska recognizes seventeen official athletic directors, though at least fourteen others have held the role in an interim or de facto capacity. NU's longest-serving athletic director was Bob Devaney, who led the department from 1967 to 1992.

== History ==
In its earliest days, the Nebraska Department of Athletics had no central figure or "athletic director," and the history of how this position developed is unclear. The department's first leaders typically were part-time officials who held others titles and responsibilities at the university. Oftentimes this person served on the Athletic Board, a group of faculty members which governed the department. Early heads of the department were given the title "Athletics Manager" – the first was multi-sport coach and physical education professor Raymond G. Clapp, who filled the role from 1902 to 1905. The first individual to hold the title "athletic director" was E. J. Stewart, who served from 1916 to 1919 and also coached football and basketball during parts of his tenure. However, Nebraska does not consider Stewart its first athletic director because it was not a full-time administrative position; this designation belongs to Fred Luehring, who became AD in 1920. Like Clapp and Stewart, many of Nebraska's early athletic directors simultaneously coached one of the university's major varsity teams, primarily football – six of NU's first ten athletic directors also coached football during their tenure.

Aside from Bob Devaney, NU's football coach for the first six of his twenty-six years as athletic director, the position has been a standalone role since 1954. Including Devaney, five members of the College Football Hall of Fame have held the position.

== List of part-time athletic managers ==
No.	Athletic manager	Tenure
1	Raymond G. Clapp	1902–1905
2	Earl Eager	1905–1911
	Ewald O. Stiehm (Note: Though Stiehm was never recorded to have held the title of "athletic manager" or "athletic director," the Cornhusker yearbook lists no head of the department in 1912 and 1913, while Stiehm, the "all-year coach," seemed to be the de facto head.)	1911–1915
3	Guy Reed	1914–1918
4	E. J. Stewart (Note: Stewart was the first to hold the title "athletic director," but the university does not consider him as such because it was not a full-time position.)	1916–1919
5	Robert Scott	1919
	James T. Lees	1919–1920

== List of athletic directors ==
No.	Athletic director	Tenure	End of tenure
1	Fred Luehring (Note: Luehring was the first head of the Athletics Department to have a "full-time" position as designated by the Board of Regents)	1920–1922	Resigned to become athletic director at Minnesota
2	Fred Dawson	1922–1925	Resigned to become head football coach at Denver
Interim	Herbert D. Gish	1925–1928	
3	Herbert D. Gish	1928–1932	Entered private business
4	Dana X. Bible	1932–1936	Resigned to become head football coach at Texas
5	Biff Jones	1937–1942	Ordered to active duty by the United States Army. Became athletic director at the United States Military Academy
Interim	John K. Selleck	1942–1943	Became comptroller of the university
Interim	Glenn Presnell	1943	Joined the United States Navy
Interim	Adolph J. Lewandowski	1943–1946	
6	Adolph J. Lewandowski	1946–1947	Resigned to focus on his duties as business manager for the athletic department
7	George Clark	1948–1953	Retired
Interim	Adolph J. Lewandowski	1953–1954	
8	Bill Orwig	1954–1961	Resigned to become athletic director at Indiana
Interim	Charles Miller; Joseph Soshnik	1961–1962	
9	Tippy Dye	1962–1967	Resigned to become athletic director at Northwestern
10	Bob Devaney	1967–1992	Retired
11	Bill Byrne	1992–2002	Resigned to become athletic director at Texas A&M
Interim	Joe Selig	2002–2003	
12	Steve Pederson	2003–2007	Fired
Interim	Tom Osborne	2007	
13	Tom Osborne	2007–2013	Retired
14	Shawn Eichorst	2013–2017	Fired
Interim	Dave Rimington	2017	
15	Bill Moos	2017–2021	Retired
Interim	Garrett Klassy	2021	
16	Trev Alberts	2021–2024	Resigned to become athletic director at Texas A&M
Interim	Dennis Leblanc	2024	
17	Troy Dannen	2024–present	
