= Cynthia H. Milligan =

American lawyer

Cynthia Hardin Milligan is a director of Wells Fargo & Company and a former dean of the College of Business Administration at the University of Nebraska–Lincoln.

Milligan received her BA degree in French from the University of Kansas and her JD degree from the George Washington University. She first practiced law with a large Washington, D.C., law firm before becoming a senior partner in a law firm in Lincoln, Nebraska, in 1981.

In her law career she has served as an adjunct professor at Georgetown University Law College and an adjunct professor at the University of Nebraska College of Law with emphasis in the areas of taxation and banking law. Milligan also served as director of banking and finance for the State of Nebraska.

From 1991 to 1998 she was president and chief executive officer of Cynthia Milligan & Associates, a consulting firm for financial institutions located in Lincoln, Nebraska. In 1992 she was elected a director of Norwest Bank, and upon the merger with Wells Fargo & Company in 1998 she became a director of Wells Fargo. She was also elected a director of infoUSA in 2000 and Raven Industries in 2001.

Milligan was named the eighth dean of the College of Business Administration of the University of Nebraska–Lincoln in 1998. She served until the summer of 2010.

Besides her academic position, Milligan was a director of Wells Fargo & Company, San Francisco, California; the Gallup Organization, Omaha, Nebraska, and Princeton, New Jersey; Calvert investment funds, Bethesda, Maryland; and the W.K. Kellogg Foundation, Battle Creek, Michigan.

She and her husband, Robert S. Milligan, a businessman, are the parents of five children. Milligan is the daughter of former Secretary of Agriculture, Clifford M. Hardin, and sister of Nancy H. Rogers.
