= Leitzel =

Leitzel is a surname. Notable people with this surname include:

- Joan Leitzel (1936–2026), American mathematician
- Lillian Leitzel (1892–1931), German-American acrobat and entertainer
