= Joan Leitzel =

American mathematician (1936–2026)

17th President of the University of New Hampshire
- In office 1996–2002
- Preceded by: Dale F. Nitzschke
- Succeeded by: Ann Weaver Hart

Interim Chancellor of the University of Nebraska–Lincoln
- In office July 22, 1995 – January 31, 1996
- Preceded by: Graham Spanier
- Succeeded by: James Moeser

Personal details
- Born: Joan Ruth Phillips; July 2, 1936 Valparaiso, Indiana, U.S.
- Died: March 5, 2026 (aged 89)
- Spouse: James R. C. Leitzel
- Children: 2
- Education: Hanover College; Brown University; Indiana University Bloomington
- Occupation: Mathematician

Joan Ruth Leitzel (née Phillips; July 2, 1936 – March 5, 2026) was an American mathematician and university administrator. She served as interim Chancellor of the University of Nebraska–Lincoln for six months before becoming the president of the University of New Hampshire. She served in that role from 1996 to 2002 and received the Charles Holmes Pettee Medal in 2002 for her contributions to the University of New Hampshire.

== Life and career ==
Leitzel graduated from Valparaiso High School. She then attended Hanover College (BA 1958), Brown University (AM 1961), and Indiana University Bloomington (PhD 1965) in algebra under the supervision of George William Whaples.

She was the commencement speaker at Hanover College and received an honorary doctorate degree from her undergraduate alma mater in May 2024.

== Death ==
Joan Leitzel died on March 5, 2026, at the age of 89. A widow, she was survived by two sons, two siblings, four grandchildren, one great-granddaughter, and extended family.
