= James Zumberge =

American geologist and university president (1923–1992)

James H. Zumberge

9th President of the University of Southern California
- In office 1980–1991
- Preceded by: John R. Hubbard
- Succeeded by: Steven Sample

7th President of Southern Methodist University
- In office 1975–1980
- Preceded by: Paul Hardin III
- Succeeded by: L. Donald Shields

14th Chancellor of the University of Nebraska–Lincoln
- In office January 1, 1972 – September 30, 1975
- Preceded by: Joseph Soshnik
- Succeeded by: Roy Young

Director of the School of Earth Science at University of Arizona
- In office 1968–1972

1st President of Grand Valley State University
- In office 1962–1968

Personal details
- Born: December 27, 1923 Minneapolis, Minnesota, U.S.
- Died: April 15, 1992 (aged 68) Pasadena, California, U.S.
- Education: University of Minnesota
- Occupation: Academic administrator

James Herbert Zumberge (December 27, 1923 – April 15, 1992) was a professor of geology and president of Grand Valley State University from 1962 to 1969, of Southern Methodist University from 1975 to 1980, and of the University of Southern California from 1980 to 1991.

== Biography ==
=== Early life and education ===
James Herbert Zumberge was born in Minneapolis, Minnesota, in 1923 to Herbert Samuel and Helen Reich Zumberge. He served in the military (U.S. Marine Corps) before earning a Ph.D. in geology from the University of Minnesota in 1950. His thesis was on the formation of the Great Lakes.

=== Career ===
Zumberge taught for several years at the University of Michigan and later was the director of the earth sciences school at the University of Arizona. He led several expeditions in Antarctica and was chief glaciologist for the U.S. Ross Ice Shelf project in Antarctica. Cape Zumberge and the Zumberge Coast bear his name.

He served as the first President of Grand Valley State University from 1962 to 1968, Director of the School of Earth Science at University of Arizona 1968–72, Chancellor of the University of Nebraska-Lincoln from 1972 to 1975, the seventh president of Southern Methodist University from 1975 to 1980, and the ninth president of University of Southern California from 1980 to 1991.

While President of USC, Zumberge instituted a revenue-center management system, where individual schools and units were responsible for their own revenue and expenses.

=== Death and legacy ===
Zumberge died at age 68 in Pasadena, California, as the result of a brain tumor.

James H. Zumberge Hall (originally the Zumberge Library) and Zumberge Pond at Grand Valley State University's Allendale Campus are named for him, as well as Zumberge Hall of Sciences, one of the natural science buildings at USC.
