= University of Nebraska Press =

American university press

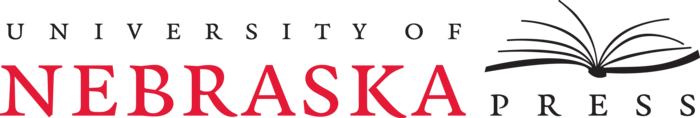
- Parent company: University of Nebraska–Lincoln
- Founded: 1941; 85 years ago
- Country of origin: United States
- Headquarters location: Lincoln, Nebraska
- Distribution: UNC Press (US); Codasat Canada (Canada); Combined Academic Publishers (EMEA for UNP, JPS); Casemate (Europe for Potomac); Eurospan Group (Asia, the Pacific)
- Publication types: Books; Academic journals
- Imprints: Bison Books; Potomac Books; Jewish Publication Society
- Official website: www.nebraskapress.unl.edu

The University of Nebraska Press (UNP) is an academic publisher of scholarly and general-interest books. Established in 1941, the press is under the auspices of the University of Nebraska–Lincoln, the main campus of the University of Nebraska system. UNP publishes primarily non-fiction books and academic journals, in both print and electronic editions. The press has particularly strong publishing programs in Native American studies, the history and culture of the American West, sports, world and national affairs, and military history. The press has also been active in reprinting classic books from various genres, including science fiction and fantasy.

Since its inception, UNP has published more than 4,000 books and thirty journals, adding approximately 150 titles each year, making it the twelfth-largest university press in the United States. Three of UNP's books have received the Bancroft Prize, the highest honor bestowed on history books in the U. S.

Domestic distribution is provided by the University of North Carolina Press's Longleaf Services. UNP is a member of the Association of University Presses.

== History ==
The University of Nebraska Press began in November 1941 at the prompting of chancellor Chauncey Samuel Boucher, who hired Emily Schossberger as UNP's first editor. UNP became the 32nd American university press and seventh in the Midwest. During Schossberger's seventeen-year tenure UNP published 97 books, primarily focused on regional titles and the works of Louise Pound, Karl Shapiro, and George W. Norris. Following Schossberger's departure, Bruce Nicoll became UNP's first official director and Virginia Faulkner became editor-in-chief. Nicoll led the UNP for seventeen years and expanded its focus to publish books of more diverse backgrounds, not simply monographs for and by scholars. That led to the launch of UNP's first imprint in 1961, Bison Books, specializing in paperback books to be sold in non-traditional places such as truck stops, drug stores, and gas stations. In 1966 the press expanded by creating distribution partnerships overseas.

In 1975, Dave Gilbert became UNP director and reoriented Bison Books toward a more western focus. Gilbert hired designer Richard Eckersley and his wife Dika to bring all book design in-house. Gilbert eventually left for a post at Cornell University and was succeeded by editor-in-chief Bill Regier, UNP's third full-time director. Regier expanded UNP's focus beyond the American West into foreign translations and literature, particularly France and Scandinavia, with three translation authors later receiving Nobel Prizes. By 1991, UNP had 2,000 books in print, was adding 100 new books per year, and had annual sales of $4.5 million. Dan Ross became director in 1995, expanding Bison Books to focus on sports, especially baseball, the start of UNP's highly regarded sports publishing program. In Ross's first year, UNP's annual sales topped $6 million, a 600-percent increase from 1980.

By the early 2000s, Gary Dunham became director and in 2009 UNP sold its longtime warehouse in the Haymarket District. With Donna Shear as editor-in-chief, Bison Books was redefined to solely represent books of the west and UNP switched to a print-on-demand model of publishing, coordinating the simultaneous release of ebooks with the print editions. Shear also tripled journal production to thirty publications and in September 2011 the press entered into a collaborative publishing arrangement with the Jewish Publication Society, one of the oldest Jewish publishers in the United States. In April 2013, the press acquired Potomac Books, a publisher specializing in military and diplomatic topics. With the new additions, UNP surpassed $7 million in sales in 2015, moved up in status with the Association of University Presses, and become the twelfth-largest university press in the country. Three of the press's books have received the Bancroft Prize, the highest honor bestowed on history books in the U. S.

== Imprints ==
=== Nebraska ===
Under its Nebraska imprint, UNP publishes both scholarly and general interest books, with a particular focus on Native and Indigenous studies, history, sports history, American studies and cultural criticism, environmental studies, anthropology, and creative works. UNP publishes scholarly editions of the works of Willa Cather, including the classics My Ántonia and O Pioneers!.

=== Bison Books ===
Bison Books began in 1961 as UNP's first trade imprint and originally focused on inexpensive paperbacks of general-interest works in Western Americana. In 2013 Bison Books shifted its focus to the trans-Mississippi West. The imprint has featured the work of notable authors such as André Breton, George Armstrong Custer, William F. Cody, Loren Eiseley, Michel Foucault, Che Guevara, Wright Morris, Tillie Olsen, Mari Sandoz, Wallace Stegner, Leo Tolstoy, Philip Wylie, and Stefan Zweig.

Bison Books issues Bison Frontiers of Imagination, a series of science fiction novels that includes works by Jules Verne, Hugo Gernsback, Edgar Rice Burroughs, A. Merritt, E. E. Smith, and Karel Čapek.

=== Potomac Books ===
Potomac Books began in 1983 as Brassey's, the U. S. imprint of a longstanding British publishing enterprise that focused on military subjects. The trade imprint was acquired by Books International in 1999 and renamed Potomac Books in 2004, expanding its catalog to include world and national affairs, presidential history, diplomats and diplomacy, and biography and memoir. UNP purchased Potomac Books in 2013.

=== Jewish Publication Society ===
The Jewish Publication Society (JPS) is the oldest nonprofit, nondenominational publisher of Jewish works in English. Founded in Philadelphia in 1888, it is known for its English translation of the Hebrew Bible, the NJPS Tanakh. UNP purchased all of JPS's outstanding book inventory, and is responsible for the production, distribution, and marketing all JPS publications, although JPS continues its operations from its Philadelphia headquarters, acquiring new manuscripts and developing new projects.

== See also ==
- List of English-language book publishing companies
- List of university presses
