= Chancellor of the University of Nebraska–Lincoln =

Head of the University of Nebraska–Lincoln

- Incumbent; Katherine Ankerson (interim); Acting since January 12, 2026
- University of Nebraska–Lincoln
- Reports to: President of the University of Nebraska
- Appointer: Board of Regents
- Formation: 1871; 155 years ago
- First holder: Allen R. Benton
- Salary: $732,000
- Website: Office of the Chancellor

The chancellor of the University of Nebraska–Lincoln is the chief administrative officer of the University of Nebraska–Lincoln and is selected by the University of Nebraska System president and confirmed by the Nebraska Board of Regents. The position was most recently held by Rodney D. Bennett from July 2023 to January 2026. The current interim chancellor is Katherine S. Ankerson.

== History ==
=== Rise to Western prominence ===
The University of Nebraska was created by an act of the Nebraska state legislature in 1869, receiving an initial land grant of about 130,000 acres (53,000 ha) through the Morrill Act of 1862. The office of the chancellor was created two years after the university's founding, and Allen R. Benton began his tenure as Nebraska's first chancellor on September 6, 1871. Benton's responsibilities were wide-ranging, but the bulk of his duties were to develop the infrastructure of the young and rapidly expanding school. Benton resigned in 1876 to return to his post as president of North-Western Christian University (now Butler University); his departure was prompted by a period of turmoil for the university brought on largely by a years-long grasshopper swarm across Nebraska. His successor, Edmund Burke Fairfield, led a contentious tenure as chancellor highlighted by clashes over the place of religion in higher education. Under Fairfield's watch, the University of Nebraska hired its first female faculty member, Ellen Smith. Smith Hall, built on campus in 1967 as a student residence hall, is named in her honor.

By the time James Irving Manatt was appointed chancellor in 1884, the Board of Regents had undertaken an aggressive expansion of the University of Nebraska. Manatt attracted several high-profile faculty members to the university, but his authority was often challenged by the Board of Regents, who removed him from office in 1888. He was replaced by botany professor Charles Edwin Bessey, who served two non-consecutive terms as acting chancellor. Despite Bessey's prominence as a botanist, his brief appointments as chancellor were generally unnoteworthy.

In the University of Nebraska's early years, quick expansion and a limited budget meant many campus buildings were poorly constructed and visually unappealing. Thus, when Nebraska hired James Hulme Canfield in 1891, he immediately began an overhaul of the campus's appearance. Canfield often personally oversaw the paving of sidewalks, installation of landscaping, and construction of new buildings. These buildings included University Library (now Architecture Hall), which was built in 1895 and is the oldest building on NU's campus. Under Canfield's watch, Nebraska significantly expanded its football program and hired its first full-time athletics coach (football coach Frank Crawford). Despite Canfield serving just four years before returning to Ohio to serve as president of Ohio State University, his impact on Nebraska was such that the school later named its administration building after him. Canfield's hand-picked successor, George Edwin MacLean, offered NU's first graduate programs and established its School of Agriculture. However, he was frequently at odds with the Board of Regents as a result of his highly traditional administrative style, which clashed with Canfield's more imaginative methods, and as a result he left the chancellorship in 1899 to become the president of the State University of Iowa (now the University of Iowa).

After a second interim stretch by Charles Edwin Bessey, the University of Nebraska appointed Elisha Andrews its seventh chancellor on September 22, 1900. Just as he had done as president of Brown University, Andrews ambitiously sought funding to expand the school; a 1904 investment from John D. Rockefeller led to the construction of The Temple, which still stands on campus. In total, Andrews constructed nine new buildings in his tenure as chancellor, and oversaw a nearly doubling of the school's enrollment. By the time his health forced him to retire in 1908, the University of Nebraska was the fifth-largest public school in the United States. In lieu of a national search to find a replacement, NU quickly appointed agricultural chemistry professor Samuel Avery to the interim position, and by the end of 1908 appointed him full-time. In the first years of his appointment, Avery fought staunchly, and successfully, to make nearby Havelock (then a separate city from Lincoln frequently visited by college students) dry, claiming it could increase university enrollment by over 1,000 students in ten years.

=== War and Depression difficulties ===
Avery remained in the position until 1928, making him the longest-serving chancellor in school history. Midway through his tenure, the United States entered The Great War, and Avery was asked to join the U.S. Chemical Warfare Service; William G. Hastings served as acting chancellor while Avery was in Washington, D.C. Like most colleges across the United States, enrollment at NU plummeted as a result of the war. Nebraska was put in a particularly difficult position given the state and university's reliance on agriculture, which was slow to recover in the post-war years. As a result, the later years of Avery's chancellorship were marked with financial hardships and stagnating enrollment. A widespread fundraising campaign was necessary to fund the construction of Memorial Stadium in 1923, the school's first steel-and-concrete football stadium. Avery's successor was dean of agriculture Edgar Albert Burnett, who served from 1928 until 1938, leading the university through the height of the Great Depression. Burnett was never popular amongst the faculty, but shortly before retiring from his post he created the University of Nebraska Foundation to secure funding from non-state sources at a time when spare resources were scarce. The Foundation still serves as the university's primary fundraising outreach.

In 1938, the Board of Regents selected West Virginia University president Chauncey Samuel Boucher to replace the retiring Burnett. The Depression was still unfolding, and in response to a rising level of failing students at the university, Boucher instituted NU's first admission standards. Just as it had during World War I, enrollment plummeted at the American outset of World War II, and Boucher offered vacant buildings at the University of Nebraska to the United States military for training and shelter. He resigned shortly after the end of the war. The university appointed University of Chicago dean Reuben Gustavson as its new chancellor; an influx of new students, many of them veterans, meant NU's enrollment doubled in Gustavson's first year. Gustavson was crucial to a number of post-war developments at Nebraska, including the integration of campus dormitories and the planning of the school's medical center (now the University of Nebraska Medical Center). Gustavson was well-liked and well-respected, and after seven years at NU accepted the presidency of Resources for the Future, a nonprofit organization focusing on energy and environmental sustainability.

=== University transition and unrest ===
Clifford M. Hardin, then aged thirty-eight, became the youngest university president in the country when he was appointed Nebraska's twelfth chancellor in 1954. He quickly secured funding from the Kellogg's Company to establish the Nebraska Center for Continuing Education, a building which today bears his name as Hardin Hall. Though not an avid fan of the sport himself, Hardin prioritized the re-establishment of Nebraska as a national football power and attempted to hire high-profile head coach Duffy Daugherty from Michigan State, Hardin's previous employer. Daugherty declined, but suggested Hardin contact Wyoming head coach Bob Devaney. Over the next forty years, Devaney and his successor Tom Osborne created one of college football's great dynasties, claiming five national championships between them. Hardin later said that after the Depression, he "felt the state needed something to rally around."

Hardin was critical to the creation of the University of Nebraska system. By the 1950s, the Municipal University of Omaha (now the University of Nebraska Omaha) was run-down and inadequately funded, threatening the existence of the school entirely. Hardin spearheaded the integration of NU, Omaha, and UNMC into one state-wide system, which offered additional budget pools for Omaha to draw from. He was named the University of Nebraska system's first chancellor in 1968 (Note: Initially, the head of the University of Nebraska–Lincoln was the "president" and the head of the state-wide system was the "chancellor." These terms were swapped in August of 1971) and served for two years before being named United States Secretary of Agriculture under President Richard Nixon. During his tenure, Hardin was praised among faculty for his dedication to increasing salaries and benefits, as Nebraska faculty were among the most well-compensated in the Midwest. In the sixteen years Hardin was employed at the school, the University of Nebraska's enrollment more than tripled.

When Hardin took control of the state-wide system, he appointed his longtime colleague Joseph Soshnik to run what had become the University of Nebraska–Lincoln. Soshnik's tenure began in the midst of a transition for the universities of Nebraska, as well as a period of turmoil across many United States campuses as students protested American involvement in the Vietnam War. Unlike most university administrators of the time, Soshnik responded to protests by meeting and negotiating with student leaders, and as a result, no Vietnam War protests at the University of Nebraska–Lincoln became violent or required a National Guard intervention. Soshnik became generally well-liked by students, but the emotion and unpredictability of the chancellorship led him to resign his post in 1971 and accept a position at Omaha investment firm Kirkpatrick, Pettis, Smith, Polian.

After an interim spell by C. Peter Magrath, the Board of Regents selected James Zumberge as its new chancellor. Zumberge, a former Antarctic explorer, served for three years before resigning to become president of Southern Methodist University. Oregon State University researcher Roy Young was named his replacement the following year, and quickly secured a record amount of outside funding for various NU departments. Young left to become president of the Boyce Thompson Institute for Plant Research (now Boyce Thompson Institute) in 1980.

=== Modern stability ===
The appointment of Martin Massengale in 1981 ended a decade-long cycle in which no chancellor served more than four years. Massengale served for eleven years and was then appointed president of the University of Nebraska system. As chancellor, he spearheaded the creation of the Center for Grassland Studies and was highly involved in athletics, serving as chair of the College Football Association board of directors. Massengale retired from administrative work in 1994 and holds the title of president emeritus for the University of Nebraska system.

Graham Spanier was named Nebraska's seventeenth chancellor in 1991 and quickly addressed a significant budget shortfall while raising admission standards. Upon the retirement of Bob Devaney as athletic director in 1992, Spanier defied the wishes of head football coach Tom Osborne and hired Bill Byrne as Devaney's replacement. Osborne's program, however, was incredibly successful during Spanier's tenure, compiling a record of 45–4 and winning two national championships across four seasons. Spanier left in 1996 to become president of Pennsylvania State University, where he served until 2011 when he resigned in the wake of the Penn State child sex abuse scandal. Spanier was sentenced to two months in prison for his role in the scandal.

James Moeser was named Spanier's replacement in 1996. He pioneered the development of NU's Honors Program and secured several of the largest grants in school history. Under his watch, Nebraska's football program won another national title. Despite repeatedly stating he "wasn't looking to leave [Nebraska]," Moeser interviewed for multiple administrative positions at other universities, and became chancellor of the University of North Carolina at Chapel Hill on April 14, 2001. College of Law dean Harvey Perlman served as acting chancellor from the time of Moeser's departure until April 1, 2001, when Perlman was appointed to the position full-time. He oversaw the University of Nebraska–Lincoln's move to the Big Ten Conference, the university's first major conference transition since joining the Missouri Valley Intercollegiate Athletic Association (later the Big Eight) in 1921. (Note: The University of Nebraska–Lincoln left the Big Eight Conference in 1996, but did so with the conference's other seven members, and in effect the move only added four new schools to form the Big 12) By the time Perlman's tenure ended, NU had massively expanded its research efforts and opened Nebraska Innovation Campus, though initial progress to develop the sprawling research facility was slow. The university's once-dominant football program did not win a conference title during his time as chancellor, and Perlman's management of the athletic department was highly criticized. Perlman retired in 2016 as the university's second longest-tenured chancellor and Ronnie D. Green was named his successor.

== List of chancellors of the University of Nebraska–Lincoln ==
Below is a list of persons who had led the University of Nebraska–Lincoln since 1871:

| No. | Portrait | Chancellor (Birth–Death) | Term start | Term end | Ref. |
|---|---|---|---|---|---|
Chancellors of the University of Nebraska (1869–1968)
| 1 | | Allen R. Benton (1822–1914) | September 6, 1871 | July 1, 1876 (Note: Resigned to return as president of North-Western Christian University) | |
| 2 | | Edmund Burke Fairfield (1821–1904) | July 1, 1876 | June 30, 1882 (Note: Removed by Board of Regents) | |
| Interim | | Henry E. Hitchcock | July 1, 1882 | December 31, 1883 | |
| 3 | | James Irving Manatt (1845–1915) | January 1, 1884 | July 1, 1888 (Note: Removed by Board of Regents) | |
| Interim; 4 | | Charles Edwin Bessey (Note: Bessey served as acting chancellor from 1888 to 1891 following the removal of James Irving Mannatt. He later served in this same role from 1899 to 1900. Despite never being appointed to the full-time position, the University of Nebraska–Lincoln considers Bessey its fourth chancellor. While he served non-consecutive terms, the university does not consider Bessey its seventh chancellor) (1845–1915) | July 1, 1888 | June 30, 1891 | |
| 5 | | James Hulme Canfield (1847–1909) | July 1, 1891 | July 1, 1895 (Note: Resigned to become president of Ohio State University) | |
| 6 | | George Edwin MacLean (1850–1938) | June 1, 1895 | August 31, 1899 (Note: Resigned to become president of the State University of Iowa) | |
| Interim; 4 | | Charles Edwin Bessey | September 1, 1899 | September 21, 1900 | |
| 7 | | Elisha Andrews (1844–1917) | September 22, 1900 | November 6, 1908 (Note: Charles Edwin Bessey served as acting chancellor for several months in the summer of 1901 while Andrews took a medical leave of absence) | |
| Interim | | Samuel Avery (1865–1936) | January 1, 1908 | December 1908 | |
| 8 | | Samuel Avery (1865–1936) | December 1908 | August 1, 1928 (Note: Following the retirement of Elisha Andrews, Avery served as interim chancellor from January to December of 1908 before being appointed to the full-time position) (Note: William G. Hastings served as acting chancellor for several months during World War I when Avery was called to active duty) | |
| Interim | | Edgar A. Burnett (1865–1941) | August 2, 1928 | 1928 | |
| 9 | | Edgar A. Burnett (1865–1941) | 1928 | July 31, 1938 (Note: Following the retirement of Samuel Avery, Burnett served as interim chancellor for the remainder of 1928 before being appointed to the full-time position.) | |
| 10 | | Chauncey Samuel Boucher (1886–1955) | July 1, 1938 | July 31, 1946 (Note: Resigned) | |
| 11 | | Reuben G. Gustavson (1892–1974) | September 1, 1946 | May 1, 1953 (Note: Resigned to become president of Resources for the Future) | |
| Interim | | John K. Selleck | May 2, 1953 | June 30, 1954 | |
| 12 | | Clifford M. Hardin (1915–2010) | July 1, 1954 | October 31, 1968 (Note: Appointed first chancellor of the University of Nebraska system) | |
President of the University of Nebraska–Lincoln (1968–1971) (Note: The University of Nebraska was renamed the University of Nebraska–Lincoln in 1968, when the University of Nebraska system was established.)
| 13 | | Joseph Soshnik (1920–2002) | November 1, 1968 | June 30, 1971 (Note: Resigned to accept a position at Pettis, Smith, Polian Inc.) | |
Chancellors of the University of Nebraska–Lincoln (1971–present)
| Interim | | C. Peter Magrath | July 1, 1971 | December 31, 1971 | |
| 14 | | James Zumberge (1923–1992) | January 1, 1972 | September 30, 1975 (Note: Resigned to become president of Southern Methodist University) | |
| Interim | | Adam C. Breckenridge | October 1, 1975 | May 31, 1976 | |
| 15 | | Roy Young (1921–2013) | June 1, 1976 | August 9, 1980 (Note: Resigned to become president of the Boyce Thompson Institute for Plant Research) | |
| Interim | | Robert H. Rutford | August 10, 1980 | May 31, 1981 (Note: Soon after became the president of the University of Texas at Dallas) | |
| 16 | | Martin Massengale (b. 1933) | June 1, 1981 | December 31, 1990 (Note: Appointed president of the University of Nebraska system. Massengale relinquished his chancellor and interim president position the day before he became the University of Nebraska president on January 1, 1991.) | |
| Interim | | Jack Goebel | January 12, 1991 | October 31, 1991 | |
| 17 | | Graham Spanier (b. 1948) | November 1, 1991 | July 21, 1995 (Note: Resigned to become president of Pennsylvania State University) | |
| Interim | | Joan Leitzel (Note: Senior Vice Chancellor) | July 22, 1995 | January 31, 1996 (Note: Soon after became president of the University of New Hampshire) | |
| 18 | | James Moeser (b. 1939) | February 1, 1996 | July 15, 2000 (Note: Resigned to become chancellor of the University of North Carolina at Chapel Hill) | |
| Interim | | Harvey Perlman (b. 1942) | July 16, 2000 | April 1, 2001 | |
| 19 | | Harvey Perlman (b. 1942) | April 1, 2001 | June 30, 2016 | |
| 20 | | Ronnie D. Green (b. 1961) | July 1, 2016 (Note: Although the official transfer of the office of chancellor from Perlman to Green happened on July 1, 2016, it was announced that Perlman had given Green "decision-making power" on May 8, 2016, after the spring semester ended.) | June 30, 2023 | |
| 21 | | Rodney D. Bennett (b. 1966) | July 1, 2023 | January 12, 2026 (Note: Without stating a reason, Bennett abruptly resigned nearly six months before his three-year contract was scheduled to end.) | |
| Interim | | Katherine Ankerson (Note: Former Executive Vice Chancellor) | January 12, 2026 | Present | |

== See also ==
- President of the University of Nebraska
- Chancellor of the University of Nebraska Omaha
