= Sara Hayden =

Sara Hayden may refer to:

- Sara Shewell Hayden (1862–1939), American impressionist painter
- Sara Payne Hayden (1919–2019), joined the Women Airforce Service Pilots during World War II

== See also ==
- Sara Haden (1898–1981), American actress
