= John K. Selleck =

American academic administrator (1889–1986)

Interim Chancellor of the University of Nebraska–Lincoln
- In office May 2, 1953 – July 1, 1954
- Preceded by: Reuben G. Gustavson
- Succeeded by: Clifford M. Hardin

Personal details
- Born: John Kent Selleck; October 9, 1889 Lincoln, Nebraska, U.S.
- Died: December 2, 1986 (aged 97) Lincoln, Nebraska, U.S.
- Spouse: Ardene Hammond (m. 1919; died 1980)
- Children: 2
- Education: University of Nebraska–Lincoln
- Occupation: Electrical engineer Academic administrator

John Kent Selleck (October 9, 1889 – December 2, 1986) was an American academic administrator who was acting athletic director at the University of Nebraska–Lincoln from 1942 to 1943 and the interim Chancellor of the University of Nebraska–Lincoln from 1953 to 1954.

== Early life ==
Selleck was born in Lincoln, Nebraska on October 9, 1889. He graduated from Lincoln High School in 1908. He earned a Bachelor of Electrical Engineering from the University of Nebraska–Lincoln in 1912. In 1912, he moved to Chicago to worked in the engineering department of the National X-Ray Reflector Company in Chicago. During World War I, he was a second lieutenant in the artillery. After leaving the military, he returned to the National X-Ray Reflector Company as advertising manager. He later served as president of Western Supply, a wholesale plumbing and heating business founded by his family in 1895. On February 18, 1919, he married Ardene Hammond in Enumclaw, Washington. They had two daughters.

== Career ==
In 1921, Selleck returned to the University of Nebraska–Lincoln as the university's purchasing agent. The following year, he became the business manager for the athletic department and manager for student activities. He took the athletic department from a deficit to a profit-making venture, helped direct the campaign to fund the construction of Memorial Stadium, played an instrumental role in the construction of the Nebraska Coliseum, established the university's Band Day, and created Nebraska's season ticket and Knothole Gang programs. On February 2, 1942, he was named acting director of athletics after Biff Jones was recalled to active military service and appointed athletic director at the United States Military Academy.

In 1943, Selleck became comptroller of the University. During the 1940s and 1950s, he oversaw the construction of many of the University's buildings. He added the responsibilities of Nebraska's operating superintendent following the death of L. W. Seaton in 1948.

Selleck was appointed interim chancellor following the resignation of Reuben G. Gustavson in May 1953. He served in this role until the appointment of Clifford M. Hardin the following summer. During his tenure, Selleck supported a proposal to create a doctoral program at the Teachers College and stood by head football coach Bill Glassford after 35 members of the team demanded his resignation.

In 1954, the board of regents named the university's newly constructed dormitories in Selleck's honor. The Selleck Quadrangle housed students until 2023, then served as temporary and conference housing. In 2026, the board of regents approved demolishing the Selleck Quadrangle and the surrounding buildings to make room for a new dormatory.

Selleck stepped down as comptroller in 1958, but remained with the university as corporation secretary and president of the NU Foundation. In the latter role, he oversaw fundraising for the construction of the Nebraska Center for Continuing Education. He retired in 1962.

== Later life and death ==
After retiring, Selleck served on Lincoln's planning board and city council and was a director of the Lincoln General Hospital. He also served on the city's auditorium advisory council, which planned the financing and construction of the Pershing Center. He died on December 2, 1986 in Lincoln.
