= Roger Kirst =

Roger W. Kirst is the Henry M. Grether Professor of Law at the University of Nebraska–Lincoln College of Law. He has been a faculty member at the law school since 1974.

== Education ==
Kirst received his B.S. in Economics from the Massachusetts Institute of Technology in 1967. After receiving this degree, he went on to receive his Juris Doctor from Stanford Law School. During his time as a student, he served as a member of the Stanford Law Review.

== Career ==
Following his graduation from Stanford Law School, he was an associate at a law firm in New York City for a year. Following this experience, he actively served in the Navy JAG Corps from 1971 to 1974. Following his stint in the Navy, he became a faculty member at the University of Nebraska College of Law, where he currently is a professor of Civil Procedure, Civil Rights Litigation, and Evidence.

As a professor of law, he has published countless articles on topics ranging from the Confrontation Clause to the Rules of Discovery. In 2004, he was cited by Supreme Court Justice Antonin Scalia in Crawford v. Washington, 541 U.S. 36, 124 S.Ct. 1354 (2004).
