= Troy Dannen =

Athletic director at the University of Nebraska–Lincoln

Current position
- Title: Athletic director
- Team: Nebraska
- Conference: Big Ten
- Annual salary: $1.6 million

Biographical details
- Born: 1966 (age 59–60); Marshalltown, Iowa, U.S.
- Education: University of Northern Iowa

Administrative career (AD unless noted)
- 2008–2015: Northern Iowa
- 2015–2023: Tulane
- 2023–2024: Washington
- 2024–present: Nebraska

Troy Dannen is an American college athletics administrator. He has served as the seventeenth full-time athletic director at the University of Nebraska–Lincoln since March 2024, a position he previously held at the University of Washington, Tulane University, and the University of Northern Iowa.

== Early life and education ==
Dannen was born and raised in Marshalltown, Iowa. He attended Iowa State University for a semester before transferring to the University of Northern Iowa, where he worked as an athletic assistant and graduated with a bachelor's degree in public relations with a minor in journalism in 1989. Dannen covered softball for a local newspaper and officiated high school sporting events while in college, and later served as the public address announcer for Drake women's basketball for a single season.

== Administrative career ==
During college, Dannen interned at the Iowa Girls High School Athletic Union, the only organization of its kind in the United States. He was hired to a full-time position after graduating, and later served as director of the IGHSAU from 2002 to 2008.

Throughout his administrative career, Dannen has served on the NCAA Constitution Committee, NCAA Transformation Committee, and NCAA Football Oversight Committee. He has been the chairman of the NCAA Football Competition Committee since 2020.

=== Northern Iowa ===
In 2008, Dannen was named athletic director of the Northern Iowa Panthers, his alma mater. In his introductory press conference, Dannen claimed he would not oversee the elimination of any athletic programs at UNI; however, months later, a significant reduction in the athletic department's state funding resulted in the elimination of the school's baseball program. Throughout his eight-year tenure as the Panthers' athletic director, Dannen oversaw significant upgrades to many athletic facilities and renegotiated the school's multimedia right and apparel and equipment contracts. He signed football coach Mark Farley and basketball coach Ben Jacobson to lengthy contract extensions; both remained at UNI for many years after Dannen's departure. He was named FCS Athletic Director of the Year by the National Association of Collegiate Directors of Athletics in 2014.

=== Tulane ===
Dannen departed his alma mater for Tulane in 2015. He inherited a football program without a head coach following the firing of Curtis Johnson; a week later, Dannen announced the hiring of Willie Fritz from Georgia Southern. Fritz's eight-year tenure became one of the most successful stretches in program history, culminating in a 46–45 victory over USC in the 2023 Cotton Bowl and a national No. 9 ranking.

In 2016, Tulane baseball head coach David Pierce accepted the same position at Texas. Dannen hired Vanderbilt assistant Travis Jewett to lead the Green Wave program, which made the College World Series in 2001 and 2005 but had missed the postseason for six consecutive years prior to Pierce's arrival. After six seasons, Jewett and Tulane mutually parted ways and Dannen named Jewett's assistant Jay Uhlman head coach, the last major-sport head coaching hire Dannen made at Tulane before departing for Washington.

Dannen was a finalist for the Sports Business Journal’s Athletic Director of the Year award in 2022.

=== Washington ===
In October 2023, Dannen was named athletic director at the University of Washington. The Huskies, fast approaching a transition from the Pac-12 Conference to the Big Ten, reached the College Football Playoff National Championship under head coach Kalen DeBoer shortly after Dannen's hiring. Following the season, Dannen and UW tabled a contract worth $9.4 million annually to DeBoer, who instead accepted an offer to replace Nick Saban as Alabama's head coach. Arizona's Jedd Fisch was named UW's new head coach two days later.

Near the end of the 2023–24 season, Dannen fired basketball coach Mike Hopkins following a fifth consecutive season without a postseason appearance of any kind; Dannen departed before hiring a replacement.

=== Nebraska ===
In March 2024, Dannen was named the seventeenth full-time athletic director at the University of Nebraska–Lincoln. His six-year contract paid an initial base salary of $1.6 million with an annual increase of $100,000. After nine years working outside the region, Dannen cited his Midwestern roots and Lincoln's proximity to both his and his wife's families as contributing factors to his sudden departure from Washington.

== Personal life ==
Dannen and his wife Amy have two children, daughter Elle and son William. He has two older daughters, Holly and Emily, from a previous marriage.
