= Steve Pederson =

American college athletics administrator

Biographical details
- Education: University of Nebraska–Lincoln

Administrative career (AD unless noted)
- 1996–2002: Pittsburgh
- 2002–2007: Nebraska
- 2007–2014: Pittsburgh

Steve Pederson was athletic director (AD) at the University of Nebraska–Lincoln and the University of Pittsburgh. He began his career as a college football recruiting coordinator at Ohio State, Tennessee, and Nebraska. He has worked with five College Football Hall of Fame football coaches.

== First Pittsburgh tenure ==
Pederson was hired as the 10th athletic director of the University of Pittsburgh on October 28, 1996, at 39 years old. He quickly implemented several sweeping and controversial changes to resurrect an athletic program that had fallen on hard times. He removed several employees of the athletic department and in the spring of 1997 changed and standardized the athletic uniforms, colors, and logos used by Pittsburgh Athletic Department to emphasize the heritage and location of the university. This involved deemphasizing the traditional use of "Pitt" in preference for the use of "Pittsburgh" to refer to the school in press releases and in signage. In doing so, he also abandoned the use of the traditional "Pitt script" logo that had adorned football helmets since 1973. New logos designed by Peter Moore that utilized a "torch-cut" font, which alluded to the heritage of Pittsburgh's steel industry, were introduced along with a new Panther logo with a similar torch-cut style. The blue and gold shades used by the athletic department, previously royal to navy blue and yellow to mustard gold, were also changed to midnight blue and vegas gold. In addition, the existing Golden Panther booster club organization was scrapped and replaced with a new club termed Team Pittsburgh. These moves were controversial among fans, boosters and traditionalists of the University of Pittsburgh athletic teams.

Early in Pederson's tenure, he also moved to replace then head football coach Johnny Majors with Walt Harris who took Pitt to the Liberty Bowl, Pitt's first bowl in eight seasons, in his first season as head coach in 1997. Pederson also hired Ben Howland as Pitt's head men's basketball coach in 1999 to replace Ralph Willard. Howland proceeded to take Pitt to its first NCAA Tournament in nine seasons. In addition to Harris and Howland, Pederson hires included Alonzo Webb for track and field, Traci Waites for women's basketball, Joe Jordano for baseball, and Chris Beerman for volleyball. All six of these coaching hires went on to win Big East Conference Coach-of-the-Year honors in their respective sports. Pederson retired the football jerseys of former Panther greats Mike Ditka, Marshall Goldberg, Joe Schmidt, and Mark May. Pederson significantly elevated the athletic department's fundraising efforts, some of which was through implementing controversial donor requirements for men's basketball seating.

Among the most controversial decisions of Pederson's first tenure at Pittsburgh was the demolition of Pitt Stadium, which had served as the home for Pitt's football team, along with other sports, for 75 years. The Stadium was razed following the 1999 season to make way for the construction of the Petersen Events Center. The football team moved their home games permanently to newly constructed Heinz Field in 2001 after a one-year temporary stop at Three Rivers Stadium for the 2000 season. Pederson also oversaw the move of the football team into state-of-the art practice facilities that he helped to design at the UPMC Sports Performance Complex in 2000 as well as a refurbishment and expansion of Fitzgerald Field House in 1999.

In 2002, Pederson was awarded the General Robert R. Neyland Athletic Director Award which is presented by the All-American Football Foundation for outstanding administrative achievement. Legendary sports historian and commentator Beano Cook said Pederson "rebuilt Pitt athletics. He saved Pitt sports."

Pederson left Pitt to return to his alma mater, the University of Nebraska–Lincoln where he assumed athletic director duties in December 2002.

== Nebraska tenure ==
Pederson was hired as Nebraska's 12th athletic director on December 20, 2002. After records of 7–7 and 9–3 in the previous two seasons, Pederson controversially fired head football coach Frank Solich. Pederson justified the move by stating he would not "let Nebraska gravitate into mediocrity" and would not "surrender the Big 12 to Oklahoma and Texas". Solich's 58 wins during his first six seasons as Nebraska's head coach exceeded that of his two College Football Hall of Fame predecessors: Bob Devaney (53 wins) and Tom Osborne (55 wins).

Pederson told boosters he fired Solich because “high profile” candidates were “interested.” However, Pederson had not even hired a search firm, believing he could poach coach Steve Spurrier from the NFL’s Washington Redskins; Pederson failed to even ask Spurrier if he had any interest in the Nebraska position prior to firing Solich. Pederson then tried, again unsuccessfully, to woo coach Urban Meyer away from Utah. The futile, disorganized coaching search hit rock bottom when a private jet owned by Nebraska donor-of-substance Howard Hawks sat on a runway in Fayetteville, Arkansas, for hours while Arkansas coach Houston Nutt used Pederson’s desperate offer as leverage to renegotiate his contract with the Razorbacks.

Shortly thereafter, interim head coach Bo Pelini led Solich's team to its 10th victory of the season, and later interviewed for the permanent head coach position. Nebraska’s quarterbacks coach Turner Gill did the same. After a 40-day coaching search, Pederson hired former Oakland Raiders coach Bill Callahan as Solich's permanent successor. Callahan led the Huskers to a 27–22 record in 4 seasons as Nebraska's head football coach; 7 of the victories came against lower tier Group of Five and Football Championship Subdivision competition.

On October 13, 2007, the Cornhuskers lost their homecoming game 45–14 to Oklahoma State. Two days later, Pederson was fired by chancellor Harvey Perlman and six weeks later, Callahan was also dismissed.

== Second Pittsburgh tenure ==
Pederson was rehired by the University of Pittsburgh as its athletic director on November 30, 2007, following the departure of Jeff Long to the University of Arkansas. Pederson was relieved of his duties as Pitt's athletic director on December 17, 2014. Among his actions during his second tenure at Pittsburgh, Pederson hired volleyball head coach Toby Rens and softball head coach Holly Aprile, as well as sign men's and women's head basketball coaches, Jamie Dixon and Agnus Berenato respectively, to contract extensions. In August 2009, Pederson announced that Pitt's athletic teams would switch from being outfitted by Adidas to Nike and the school unveiled new football uniforms that included design elements reminiscent of those that were worn prior to Pederson's first tenure as athletic director at the university. On December 7, 2010, Pederson forced head football coach Dave Wannstedt to resign following a disappointing 7-5 season.

After a week-long search, Pederson hired Miami University head coach Mike Haywood to succeed Wannstedt. But on December 31, 2010, Haywood was fired by Pitt after his arrest on a felony domestic battery charge made the day before and only hours after Haywood posted bond and was released from jail. Pederson then announced the hiring of Todd Graham as the new head coach on January 10, 2011. Following a 6-6 season, Graham resigned on December 14, 2011, less than one year later, in order to take the Arizona State head coaching position. The university hired offensive coordinator Paul Chryst from the University of Wisconsin on December 22, 2011. On December 17, 2014, Chryst left to take the job as head coach at Wisconsin. Pederson stepped down the same day and vice-chancellor Dr. Randy Juhl was named interim athletic director.

Under Pederson's leadership, he negotiated the contract to move Pittsburgh from the Big East Conference to the Atlantic Coast Conference.
