= Rodney D. Bennett =

American academic

Rodney Bennett
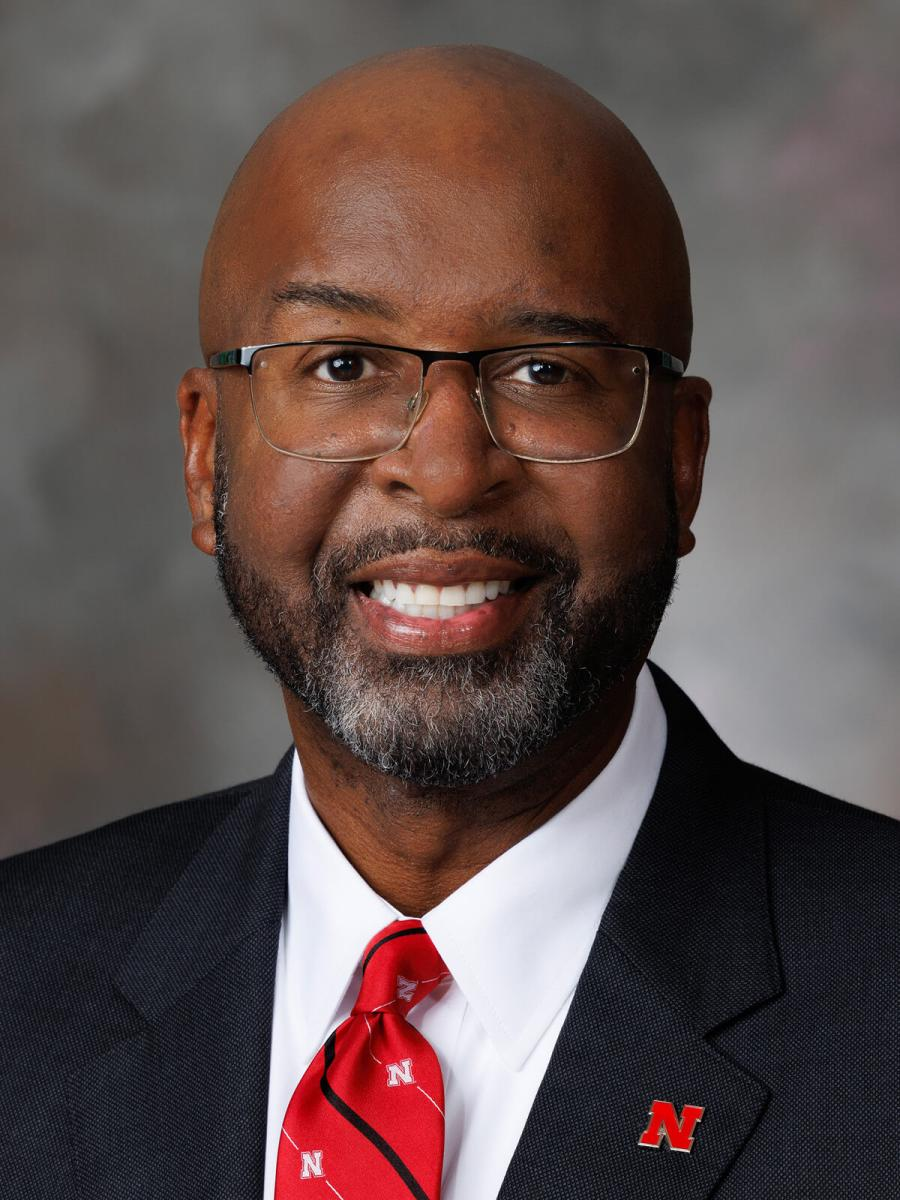
- Bennett in 2023

21st Chancellor of the University of Nebraska–Lincoln
- In office July 1, 2023 – January 12, 2026
- Preceded by: Ronnie D. Green
- Succeeded by: Katherine Ankerson (interim)

10th President of the University of Southern Mississippi
- In office April 1, 2013 – June 30, 2023
- Preceded by: Martha Dunagin Saunders
- Succeeded by: Joseph Paul

Personal details
- Born: August 15, 1966 (age 60)
- Spouse: Temple Bennett
- Education: Middle Tennessee State University (BS, MEd, EdS); Tennessee State University (EdD)

Academic background
- Thesis: The impact of selective factors related to completing the Doctor of Arts degree at Middle Tennessee State University (1996)
- Doctoral advisor: Paul Caraher

Academic work
- Discipline: Education
- Institutions: University of Georgia; Winthrop University; Middle Tennessee State University; University of Southern Mississippi; University of Nebraska–Lincoln

Rodney D. Bennett is an academic administrator who most recently served as the chancellor of the University of Nebraska–Lincoln. He had previously served as the president of the University of Southern Mississippi. Bennett received his Bachelor of Science in Mass Communication, Master of Education, and Education Specialist degrees from Middle Tennessee State University and earned his Ed.D. from Tennessee State University in Educational Administration. Bennett served as Vice President for Student Affairs at the University of Georgia, and in 2013 Bennett was appointed the 10th President of the University of Southern Mississippi.

Shortly after his appointment, the Hattiesburg campus of the University of Southern Mississippi was struck by an EF4 tornado, which did not involve any loss of life due to a students' break for the Mardi Gras holiday. In 2017, William Carey University, also located in Hattiesburg, Mississippi, was struck by a tornado, and Bennett's leadership in providing temporary space at the University of Southern Mississippi later resulted in him being honored with a doctor of humane letters, honoris causa, from William Carey. He was inducted into Omicron Delta Kappa in 2019 at the University of Southern Mississippi.

Bennett was the first African-American president of a historically and predominantly white higher education institution in Mississippi.

On July 1, 2023, Bennett took office as the 21st chancellor of the University of Nebraska–Lincoln, replacing outgoing chancellor Ronnie D. Green. On January 12, 2026, Bennett resigned as chancellor after a tumultuous year that included faculty opposition to university budget cuts.
