= Allen R. Benton =

American male scholar and university administrator

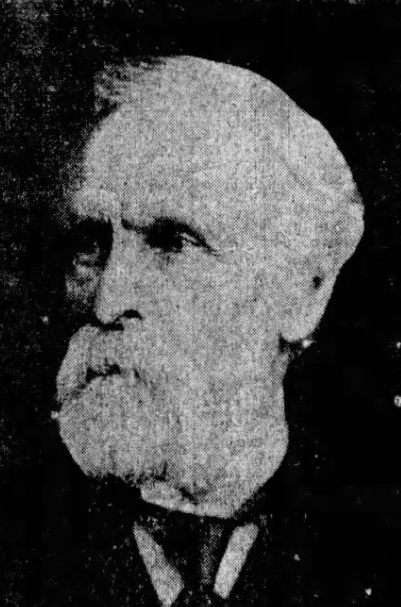

1st Chancellor of the University of Nebraska
- In office June 1, 1871 – July 1, 1876
- Preceded by: Position established
- Succeeded by: Edmund Burke Fairfield

President of North-Western Christian University
- In office 1861–1868
- Preceded by: Samuel K. Hoshour
- Succeeded by: Otis A. Burgess
- In office 1886–1891
- Preceded by: Harvey W. Everest
- Succeeded by: Scot Butler

Personal details
- Born: Allen Richardson Benton; October 1, 1822 Ira, New York
- Died: January 1, 1914 (aged 91) Lincoln, Nebraska
- Spouse: Silence Howard Benton
- Children: 3
- Education: Bethany College, University of Rochester
- Occupation: scholar, academic administrator

Allen Richardson Benton (October 1, 1822 – January 1, 1914) was an American scholar and academic administrator who served as the first Chancellor of the University of Nebraska–Lincoln from 1871 to 1876, as the president of North-Western Christian University (now Butler University) from 1861 to 1868 and again from 1886 to 1891, and possibly as the president of Mount Union College from 1869 to 1871.

== Early life ==
Benton was born in 1822 near Ira, a town in Cayuga County, New York. Although he suffered a physical breakdown due to overwork, Benton graduated from Bethany College in what was then Virginia in 1847. Benton would later go on to pursue graduate work at the University of Rochester and be ordained in the Christian Church.

== Career ==
In 1848, after graduating from Bethany College, Benton founded a classical academy called Fairview Academy in Fairview, Indiana, and served as its principal until 1854 when he left to complete graduate work at the University of Rochester in New York.

Benton was hired as a professor of ancient languages at North-Western Christian University in 1855. He was elevated to president of that university in 1861 and served in that post until 1868 when he resigned in protest over low salaries being paid to faculty members. After his resignation, he took a job as a professor of Latin at Mount Union College in Alliance, Ohio. Several sources indicate that Benton served as the president of that university as well for two years from 1869 to 1871, but the University of Mount Union today does not list Benton among its former presidents.

In January 1871, the University of Nebraska Board of Regents elected Benton as its first chancellor. Benton arrived in Lincoln, Nebraska, in May 1871 and began service as the new chancellor on June 1, 1871. It is said that many newspaper editors in Nebraska were disappointed with the selection of Benton as chancellor, but over time he gradually won broad support. Benton was officially inaugurated as the chancellor at the University of Nebraska on September 6, 1871, the day before classes began for the first time at the university. The ceremonies took place in the chapel at University Hall with acting Governor of Nebraska William H. James and J. Sterling Morton giving speeches and turning over the keys of the university to Benton. Benton's salary at Nebraska was $4,000 per year.

Seal of the University of Nebraska designed by Benton

After grasshoppers wreaked havoc on the state of Nebraska in 1874 and 1875, enrollment at the University of Nebraska dropped and opposition arose to funding the university from the Nebraska Legislature. The difficult financial times coupled with a religious controversy surrounding whether the university was to be influenced by various Christian denominations or become secular in nature led to Benton offering his resignation in December 1875, which would be effective by June 1876. Benton's time at Nebraska included several achievements. He formed the university's cirriculum around a classical model, including the study of many ancient languages and mathematics. He was responsible for planning the original four-block campus layout for the university. He also purchased a half-section along Holdrege Street for the university farm which later became East Campus. During his tenure, Benton also made many trips across Nebraska to deliver speeches, recruit, and promote the university. While on one of these trips, he created the university seal which is still used today.

After resigning from the University of Nebraska, Benton returned to North-Western Christian University in 1876, this time as a professor of philosophy. Once again, after ten years as a philosophy professor, he was elevated to a second term as the president of what was then called Butler University in 1886. After five years as president, Benton resigned in 1891 in order to devote more time to teaching. The house in which Benton and his wife resided during this period is known as the Benton House and is now open to the public as a museum.

== Personal life ==
Benton was married to Silence Howard in 1851, and they had two daughters and a son: Grace Benton Dales, Mattie Benton Stewart, and Howard Benton. James Stuart Dales, a student under Benton at Mount Union College and at the University of Nebraska and later employed by Benton at the University of Nebraska, married his eldest daughter Grace.

After the death of his wife Silence in 1900 and resigning from teaching at Butler University, Benton returned to Nebraska in 1907 to be close to his eldest daughter Grace who was still living in Lincoln with her husband J. Stuart Dales. Benton died on January 1, 1914, at the home of his eldest daughter Grace. Upon his death in a formal resolution, the Butler University Board of Directors praised Benton for his "unfailing courtesy and tolerance, the deep learning and convictions, the well rounded character and life of our old friend and teacher."

Benton's grandson, Benton Dales, served as department chair and professor of chemistry at the University of Nebraska from 1903 to 1917.
