= Benton House =

Historic house in Irvington, Indianapolis, Indiana, US

- U.S. National Register of Historic Places
- U.S. Historic district – Contributing property
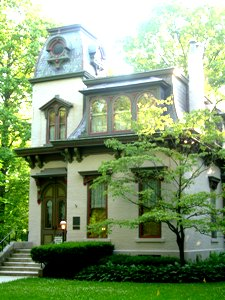
- The Benton House

- Location within Indianapolis Location within Indiana Location within the United States
- Location: Indianapolis, Indiana
- Coordinates: 39°45′56″N 86°4′34″W
- Area: 0.7 acres (0.28 ha)
- Built: 1873
- Architectural style: Second Empire
- NRHP reference No.: 73000034
- Added to NRHP: March 20, 1973

The Benton House is a historic home located in Irvington, a historic neighborhood in Indianapolis, Indiana. Constructed in 1873, the home housed Allen R. Benton, a former president of Butler University, then known as North Western Christian University. Erected on a rugged stone foundation, the two-story, Second Empire style brick house has a picturesque tower entrance and mansard roof. The twelve rooms feature fine woodwork, oak flooring, and ornate windows. Restored to its original appearance both inside and out, the only alterations are those necessary for contemporary public use such as modern restrooms, kitchen, heating, and air conditioning.

The Irvington Historic Landmarks Foundation was formed in 1966 to oversee the purchase and restoration of the Benton House. The house now serves as a meeting place for the foundation and can be rented for private parties.

Benton House annual events include a Used Booksale in the summer and Tour of Homes and Classy Car show in the fall. All proceeds from events go toward the maintenance of the Benton House and future renovations.

The home was placed on the National Register of Historic Places in 1973. In the same year, the IHLF also acquired the Kile Oak Tree. The Benton House is also listed as an Indiana museum. It is the only house on the Indianapolis East Side listed in the Historic Register that is available to the public.

== See also ==
- National Register of Historic Places listings in Marion County, Indiana
- List of attractions and events in Indianapolis
- List of museums in Indiana
