= Sara Shewell Hayden =

American impressionist painter (1862–1939)

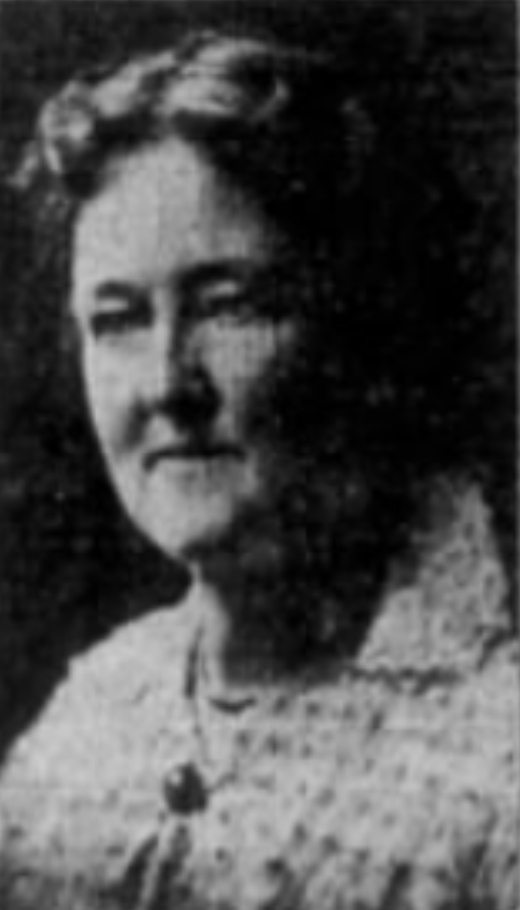
- Sara Shewell Hayden, 1916
- Born: February 28, 1862; Chicago, Illinois, US
- Died: January 3, 1939 (age 77); Park Ridge, Illinois, US
- Education: Art Institute of Chicago, class of 1890
- Notable work: Girl in Green (The Green Gown), 1899. Portrait of Ellen Smith, 1902-1903.
- Style: Genre painting, portraiture
- Awards: Silver medal recipient from Art Institute of Chicago

Sara Shewell Hayden (February 28, 1862 – January 3, 1939) was an American impressionist painter who created oil and watercolor paintings of figures, landscapes, and flowers. She received her artistic training at the Art Institute of Chicago and continued her studies in Europe. She worked as a professor of art and showed her art internationally in many exhibitions during her career, including the 1893 World's Columbian Exposition and the 1898 Paris Salon.

== Life ==
Hayden was born in Chicago, Illinois, on February 8, 1862, to parents Horatio H. Hayden and Anna S. Swift. She was the second of six surviving siblings. She never married, a decision that ultimately allowed her art career to thrive. Hayden enjoyed a successful career as a professional artist and arts educator before her death at age 77. She died in Park Ridge, Illinois, on March 1, 1939 after living as a self-described "shut-in" for ten years.

== Education ==
Hayden went to the Art Institute of Chicago and graduated with honors in 1890. Shortly thereafter, she spent two years in Paris, France, studying art at the Vitte Academy and with William Merritt Chase. Later, in 1905, she returned to Europe to once again study with Chase in Paris. She also studied on her own in Spain and England at this time.

== Career ==
After graduating from the Art Institute of Chicago in 1890, Hayden worked as a professor of art and head of the art department at the Mount Auburn Young Ladies Institute in Cincinnati, Ohio, for one year. She then returned to Illinois and taught at the Grant Collegiate Institute from 1892-1896. In the winter of 1896, she left her teaching position to spend the next two years studying in Paris. Here, she showed her work in the 1898 Paris Salon.

After returning to the United States, Hayden was hired at the University of Nebraska in 1899. She filled the role of Art Department Director, following Cora Parker's departure. Hayden was the third Art Department Director at Nebraska, and was selected from a list of thirteen applicants. In addition to her duties as department director, she taught classes on painting and drawing. She also taught art classes for members of the public on weekends.

Hayden maintained a successful academic career at Nebraska while continuing to develop her own personal studio practice at the same time. In addition to working as department director and as a professor, Hayden created art in a studio at the University Library on the campus in Lincoln. She often hosted tea parties there to promote her art work.

In 1916, Hayden was fired by Chancellor Avery. The reason he cited for her termination was that the students she put through the Art Department supposedly did not graduate with refined enough technical artistic skill. She disputed Avery's decision, believing the aforementioned reason he had provided for her termination to be false. In rebuttal, she cited a letter that she had received from the director of the Art Institute of Chicago, which stated that all the undergraduate students she sent there for graduate programs had incredible skill and talent. Additionally, a petition against her termination was created by students, and accrued hundreds of signatures from both current and former students of the Art Department. After taking her dispute with Avery to the University of Nebraska Board of Regents, the Regents decided that she was correct and had in fact been wrongfully terminated. The Regents issued her an apology and offered to reinstate her position, but she declined, leaving the university in 1916. Following her resignation, she spent time traveling around the United States and Canada, then returned to Chicago to live with her brother, Horatio S. Hayden Jr. Unfortunately, her activity in the art world largely ceased after she left the University of Nebraska, and she was not part of any more notable exhibitions following her resignation.

== Notable works ==
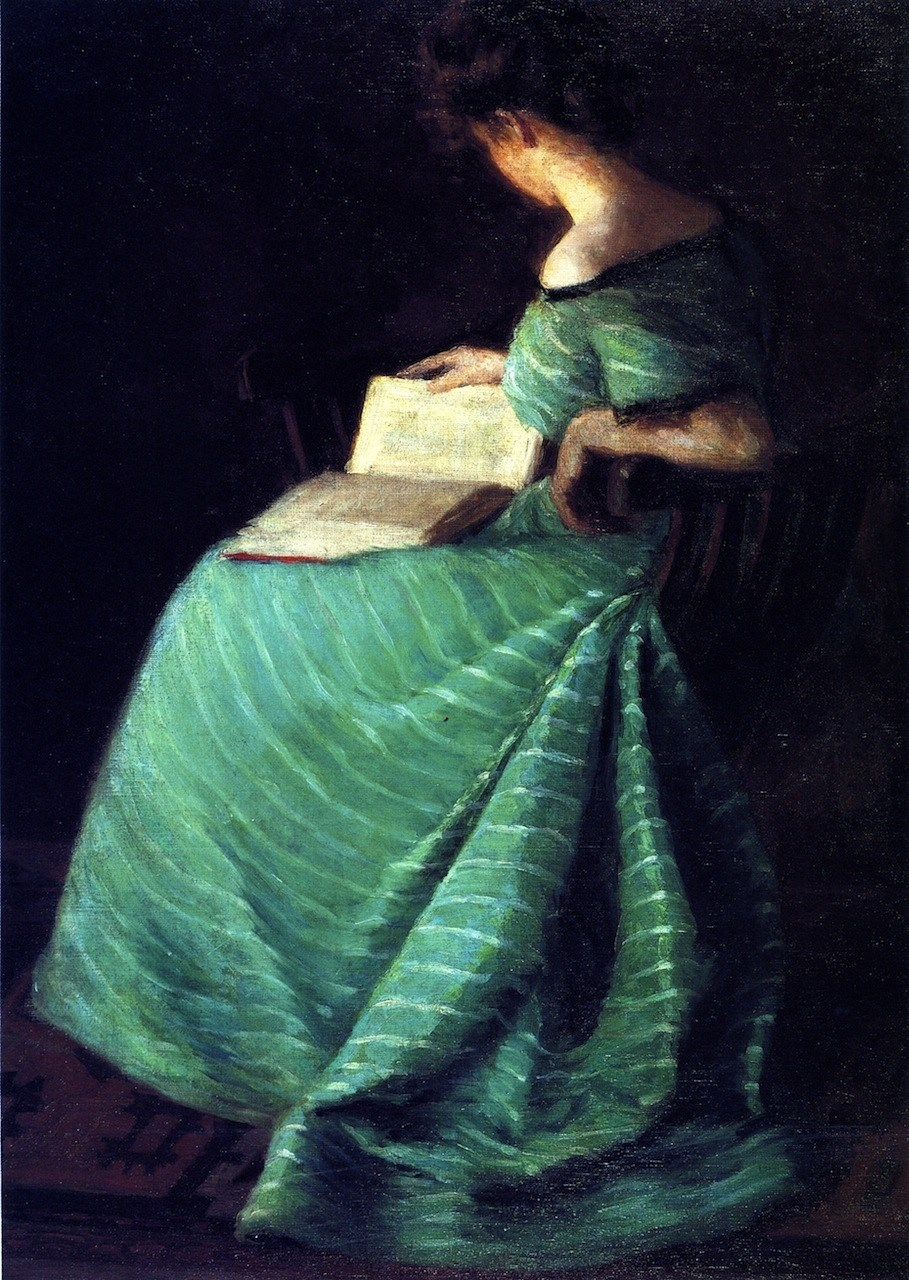
Girl in Green (The Green Gown), 1899

Portrait of a Young Woman, watercolor, 1895.

Girl in Green (The Green Gown), oil on canvas, 35 x 26 inches, 1899.

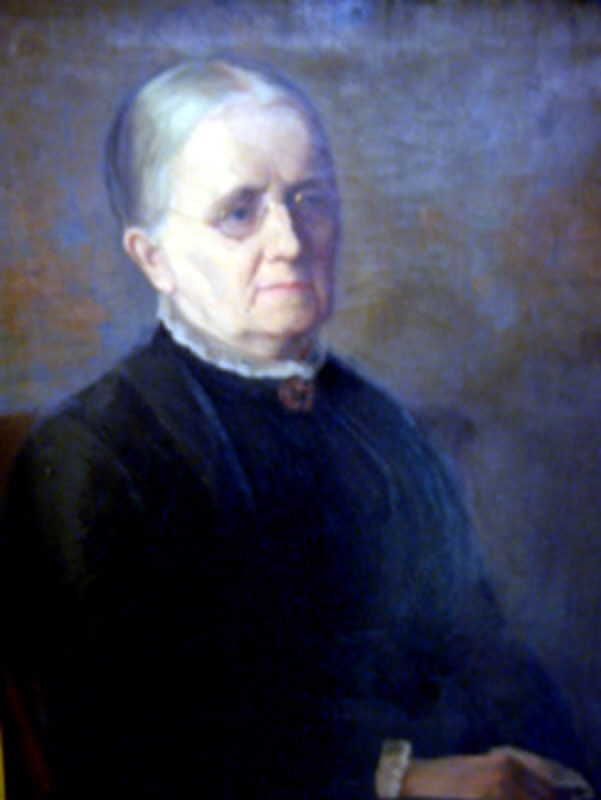
Portrait of Ellen Smith, 1902-1903

Portrait of Ellen Smith, oil on canvas, 28 x 22 inches, 1902-1903. Commissioned by UNL Class of 1902 as a gift to the University. Ellen Smith was the first female professor at UNL and worked there from 1877-1902.

== Notable Exhibitions ==
Columbian Exposition, 1893.

West Side Women's Club of Chicago Illinois Exposition, 1896.

Annual Exhibition of Works by Chicago Artists, Art Institute of Chicago, showed ten times between 1897-1911.

Paris Salon, 1898.

== Awards ==
First prize in black and white figure drawing, Art Institute of Chicago, 1888.

First prize in pen and ink drawing, Art Institute of Chicago, 1888.

Honorable Mention in water color painting, Art Institute of Chicago, 1889

Silver Medal, Art Institute of Chicago, 1890. At the time Hayden received this award, it was the highest honor a student could receive at the Institute.

First prize in watercolor painting, Portrait of a Young Woman, West Side Women's Club of Chicago Annual Art Show, 1896.
