= Ronnie D. Green =

American scientist and academic (born 1961)

Ronnie Green
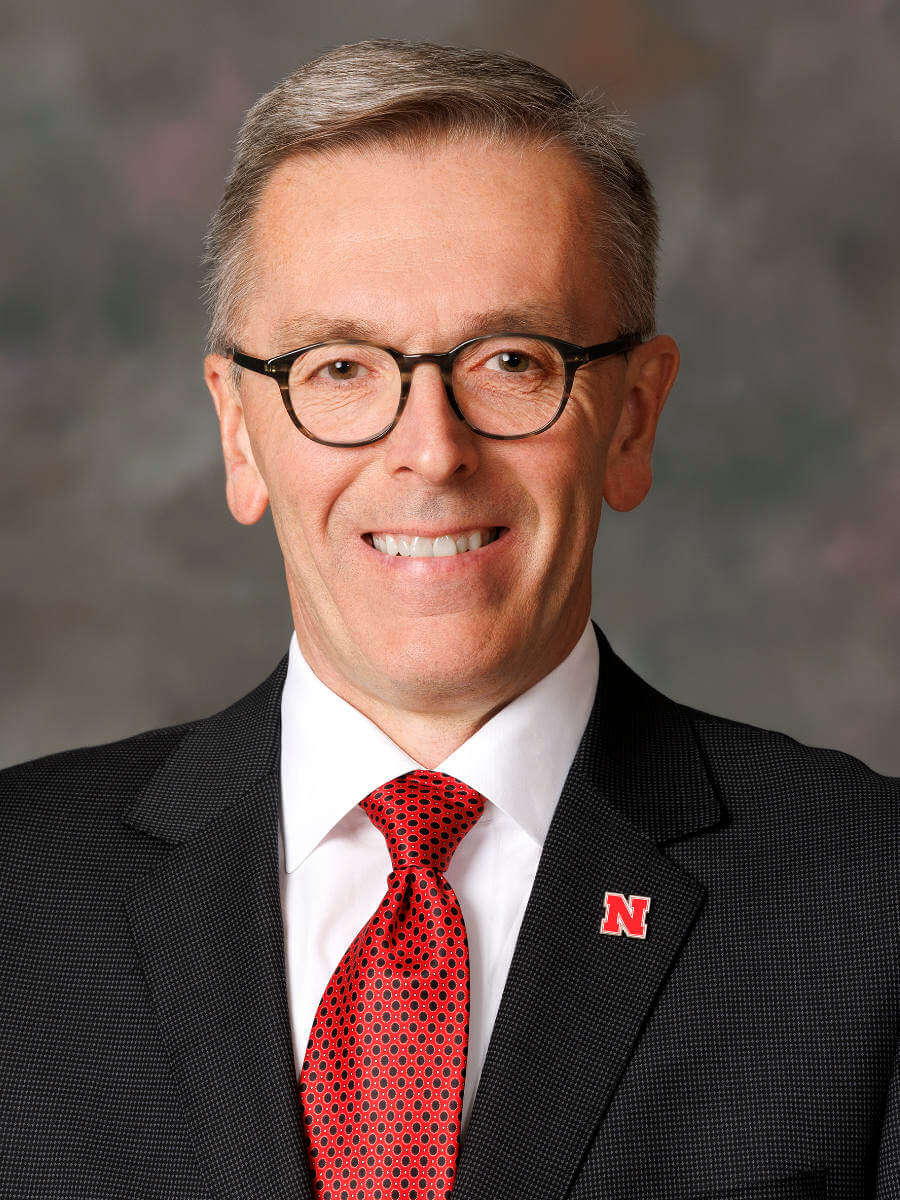

20th Chancellor of the University of Nebraska–Lincoln
- In office May 8, 2016 – June 30, 2023
- Preceded by: Harvey Perlman
- Succeeded by: Rodney D. Bennett

Personal details
- Born: June 17, 1961 (age 64) Roanoke, Virginia, U.S.
- Party: Republican
- Spouse: Jane
- Children: 2 daughters 2 sons
- Education: Virginia Tech (BS); Colorado State University (MS); University of Nebraska–Lincoln (PhD)

Ronnie David Green (born in 1961) served as the 20th chancellor of the University of Nebraska–Lincoln from 2016 to 2023. UNL is the state's flagship, a land-grant university, and is part of the University of Nebraska system. Green previously led the university's Institute of Agriculture and Natural Resources from 2010 to 2016, and served as interim Senior Vice Chancellor for Academic Affairs, the university's highest academic office, from 2015 to 2016.

== Chancellorship ==
On April 6, 2016, University of Nebraska system President Hank M. Bounds announced the selection of Green as chancellor of the University of Nebraska–Lincoln, Nebraska's flagship comprehensive research, Land-Grant and Big Ten University. He assumed the duties of the position on May 8, and was formally installed on April 6, 2017. The University of Nebraska–Lincoln was founded in 1869. Green is its 20th chancellor. Green retired as chancellor on June 30, 2023.

== Other career highlights ==
Green has served on the animal science faculties of Texas Tech University and Colorado State University, as the national program leader for animal production research for the USDA’s Agricultural Research Service, and as executive secretary of the White House’s interagency working group on animal genomics within the National Science and Technology Council. Prior to returning to the University of Nebraska, he served as senior global director of technical services for Pfizer Animal Health’s (now Zoetis) animal genomics business.

He is a past-president of both the American Society of Animal Science (ASAS) and the National Block and Bridle Club and has served in a number of leadership positions for the U.S. Beef Improvement Federation, National Cattlemen’s Beef Association, National Pork Board, the National Research Council of the National Academy of Sciences, the Association of Public and Land-Grant Universities, and Alpha Gamma Rho national fraternity. He currently is a member of a number of boards including the Big Ten Conference, Neogen Corporation, and Supporters of Agricultural Research, and was recently named to the Presidential Forum of the NCAA representing the Big Ten Conference. He was named a fellow of ASAS in 2014 and a fellow of the American Association for the Advancement of Science in 2015, and in 2017 received the Morrison Award, the ASAS's most prestigious honor.

== Academics and research ==
Green has published 130 refereed publications and abstracts, nine book chapters, and 56 invited symposia papers; and has delivered invited presentations in 43 U.S. states and 21 countries around the world. He is a past-president of the American Society of Animal Science (ASAS). He was Elected Fellow of both ASAS and the American Association for the Advancement of Science.
