= Zumberge Coast =

Coordinates: 78°0′S 74°0′W

Location of Zumberge Coast

Zumberge Coast is that portion of the southeast coast of Ellsworth Land between Cape Zumberge and the south entrance point to Hercules Inlet. Overlooking the west part of Ronne Ice Shelf, this coast was mapped by United States Geological Survey (USGS) from U.S. Navy aerial photographs taken 1961-66 and Landsat imagery taken 1973–74. Named by Advisory Committee on Antarctic Names (US-ACAN) in 1986 after James Zumberge (1923-92), American geologist and glaciologist who directed research on Ross Ice Shelf, 1957–64; Chairman, Committee on Polar Research (later Polar Research Board) of NAS, 1972–76; President, Scientific Committee on Antarctic Research (SCAR), 1982–86; President, University of Southern California, 1980–91.
