= Chauncey Samuel Boucher =

American academic and historian

10th Chancellor of the University of Nebraska
- In office July 1, 1938 – July 31, 1946
- Preceded by: Edgar A. Burnett
- Succeeded by: Reuben G. Gustavson

President of West Virginia University
- In office 1935–1938
- Preceded by: John Roscoe Turner
- Succeeded by: Charles Elmer Lawall

Personal details
- Born: June 14, 1886 Chicago, Illinois
- Died: August 13, 1955 (aged 69) Petoskey, Michigan
- Occupation: scholar, academic administrator

Chauncey Samuel Boucher (June 14, 1886 – August 13, 1955) was an American academic and historian.

Boucher was born in Chicago, Illinois, the son of Chauncey Watson Boucher and Elizabeth Celstea Van Loon. He was a professor of history at the University of Chicago; president of West Virginia University; and chancellor of the University of Nebraska. He died at Petoskey, Emmet, Michigan in 1955, aged 69.

== See also ==
- List of presidents of West Virginia University
