= Roy Young (educator) =

American male scholar and university administrator

- Born: Roy Alton Young; March 1, 1921; McAlister, New Mexico
- Died: April 19, 2013 (aged 92)
- Education: New Mexico State University, Iowa State University
- Occupations: scholar, academic administrator
- Years active: 1948–1986
- Employer(s): Oregon State University, University of Nebraska–Lincoln, Cornell University

Roy Alton Young (March 1, 1921 – April 19, 2013) was an American scholar and academic administrator who served as chancellor of the University of Nebraska–Lincoln from 1976 to 1980 and as acting president of Oregon State University from 1969 to 1970.

== Biography ==
=== Education ===
Young was born on March 1, 1921, in McAlister, New Mexico. He attended the New Mexico State University and received a bachelor's degree in Biology in 1936 and an M.S. degree in 1942 and a doctorate in 1948, both in Plant Pathology from Iowa State University.

=== Career ===
From 1942 to 1946, he was a lieutenant in the U.S. Navy, serving as a deck officer, navigator, antisubmarine warfare officer, and executive officer in the Atlantic and Pacific areas of operation. From 1946 to 1954, he served in the United States Navy Reserve and was promoted to the rank of lieutenant commander.

He was a faculty member and administrator at Oregon State University from 1948 to 1976. He served as a faculty member and chancellor of the University of Nebraska–Lincoln from 1976 to 1980. He was president and managing director of the prestigious Boyce Thompson Institute for Plant Research of Cornell University from 1980 to 1986.
