= Harvey Perlman =

Harvey S. Perlman

19th Chancellor of the University of Nebraska–Lincoln
- In office April 1, 2001 – June 30, 2016
- Preceded by: James Moeser
- Succeeded by: Ronnie D. Green

Personal details
- Born: January 17, 1942 (age 84) Lincoln, Nebraska
- Spouse: Susan Perlman
- Children: 2 daughters
- Education: University of Nebraska–Lincoln (B.A.); University of Nebraska College of Law (J.D.)
- Profession: Educator

Harvey S. Perlman is a college administrator and the former chancellor of the University of Nebraska–Lincoln. In 2016, he returned to the Nebraska Law faculty after leading the institution for 16 years.

== Early life and education ==
Harvey Perlman was born in Lincoln, Nebraska on January 17, 1942. His family moved to York, Nebraska in 1951, which is where Perlman grew up until he left to go to college. Perlman attended the University of Nebraska–Lincoln and received a Bachelors in History in 1963. After receiving an undergraduate degree Perlman went to the University of Nebraska College of Law where he graduated at the top of his class and received a Juris Doctor in 1966. While in school Perlman was the editor in chief of the Nebraska Law Review as well a member of the Order of the Coif honor society. After graduating from law school Perlman became a Bigelow Teaching Fellow at the University of Chicago Law School. A year later Perlman was offered his first job at the University of Nebraska law school as a professor.

== Career ==
In 1967 Perlman became a member of the University of Nebraska Law faculty. Perlman focused on tort and intellectual property law. In 1974 Perlman left the University of Nebraska College of Law faculty after being offered a position on the University of Virginia Law School faculty. Perlman taught torts, regulation of the competitive process, and legislative drafting at the University of Virginia Law School He continued to teach at the University of Virginia Law School until 1983 when he came back to Nebraska to become the Dean of Nebraska Law College. While the Dean of the law school, Perlman was also the Interim Senior Vice Chancellor for Academic Affairs for the University of Nebraska. Perlman remained dean of the law college until 1998 when he stepped down. Perlman was a visiting professor of law at Florida State University, University of Iowa, and University of Puget Sound. On July 16, 2000 Perlman became the Interim Chancellor of the University of Nebraska–Lincoln. On April 1, 2001 Perlman was named the nineteenth Chancellor of the University of Nebraska–Lincoln. Perlman stepped down in 2016 and returned to a teaching role at the University of Nebraska College of Law.

== Personal life ==
Perlman is married to Susan Unthank Perlman. Their daughters, Anne and Amie, both received undergraduate degrees from the University of Nebraska–Lincoln. Anne went on to get her medical degree in internal medicine from the University of Nebraska Medical Center and is a Hospitalist at Bryan Hospital in Lincoln. Amie graduated from the University of Nebraska–Lincoln with a degree in Psychology and then obtained her JD degree from the University of Nebraska College of Law and is in the General Counsel's Office of the Nebraska Department of Corrections. Both are married with three children.
