= Ellen Smith (professor) =

Ellen Smith (1838–1903) was the first female faculty member to work as a professor at the University of Nebraska-Lincoln (UNL). Hired in 1877, she worked at UNL until 1902, almost until the day she died. During her time there, she was a professor of Greek and Latin and the Principal of the Latin School. Later during her tenure at UNL, she would work in the library and serve as the University Registrar from 1884-1902.

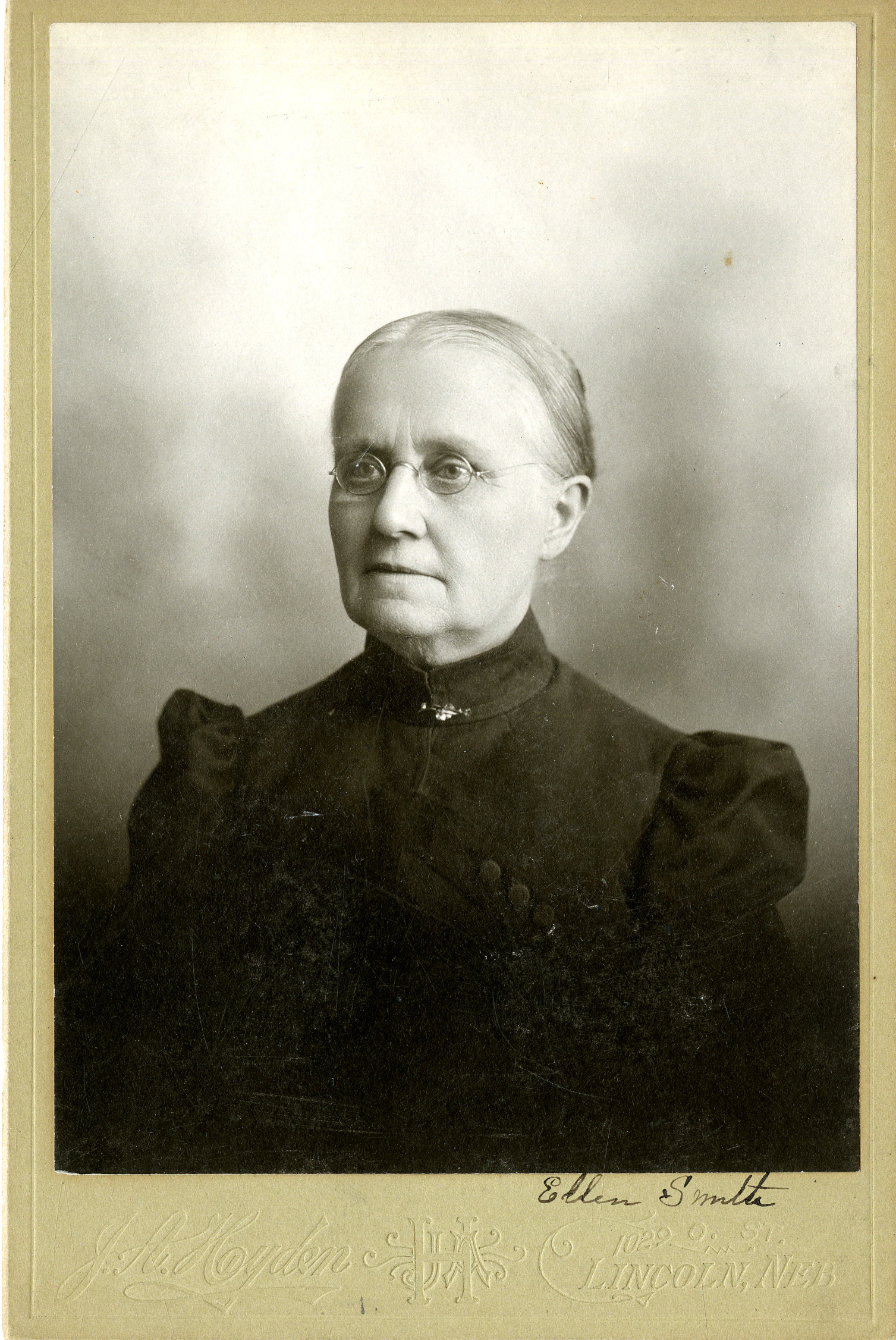
Photo of Ellen Smith, the first female faculty member of the University of Nebraska- Lincoln.

== Life ==
Smith's family came from a modest background. She was born in Orwell, Ohio, on February 14, 1838. She went to school at the Orwell Academy, receiving an education roughly equivalent to that of a modern day high school level. Smith graduated from the Orwell Academy at age 14 and became a teacher. Later, she attended the Hillsdale College in Michigan to further her education. While attending the college, she worked as a housekeeper to make ends meet. During this time, she cleaned the house of the college president, Edmund Fairfield, a connection that would later prove very important to Smith.

== Career ==
In the late 1800s, women were beginning to enter academia in a professional capacity. Fairfield, who became the chancellor of UNL in 1876, hired Smith shortly after his appointment as part of a push to modernize the institution. The first female faculty member, Smith would work as a professor of Greek and Latin and as the Principal of the Latin School from 1876-1884. In 1884, she switched to the position of University Registrar. She also worked as the only librarian until 1895, when the university's first full-time librarian, Mary Jones, was hired. Smith worked at UNL until 1903, when she became too sick with cancer to continue working.

Smith took a keen personal interest in her students, in addition to simply instructing them. She was known to house female students in the spare rooms of her home on occasion. Beloved by pupils, her obituary states that, "for years it has been said that the first visit former students would make on returning to the city was sure to be Miss Smith." She was even referred to affectionally as Ma Smith or Aunt Ellen by students.

== Death and memorial ==
Following Smith's departure from UNL in 1902, the graduating class of 1902 commissioned the then head of the Art Department, Sara Shewell Hayden, to paint a portrait of Smith to honor her. This portrait was not completed until after Smith's death in 1903. Though it was not intended as a memorial at the time of its commission, it effectively became one after Smith's death. The portrait is now a permanent part of the Sheldon Museum of Art collection, though it has not been on public display since 1982.

Smith was honored with a large memorial following her death. In attendance were members of UNL faculty and staff, students, alumni, and countless community members. She never married and had few surviving relatives, but her memorial was still greatly attended. Described in her obituary as, "the most notable character in the history of the institution," and someone who, "took an old-fashioned personal interest in each [student]," she was a notable faculty member who undoubtedly left a lasting mark on the institution.

In 1920, a building on UNL campus was dedicated as Ellen Smith Hall to honor Smith's legacy. This building was used as the administrative office for the Dean of Women, Amanda Heppner. The building was torn down in 1958 to create a green space for students to congregate. In order to continue honoring her legacy, a residence hall was subsequently named Smith Residence Hall after her.
