= Graham Spanier =

American sociologist and university administrator (born 1948)

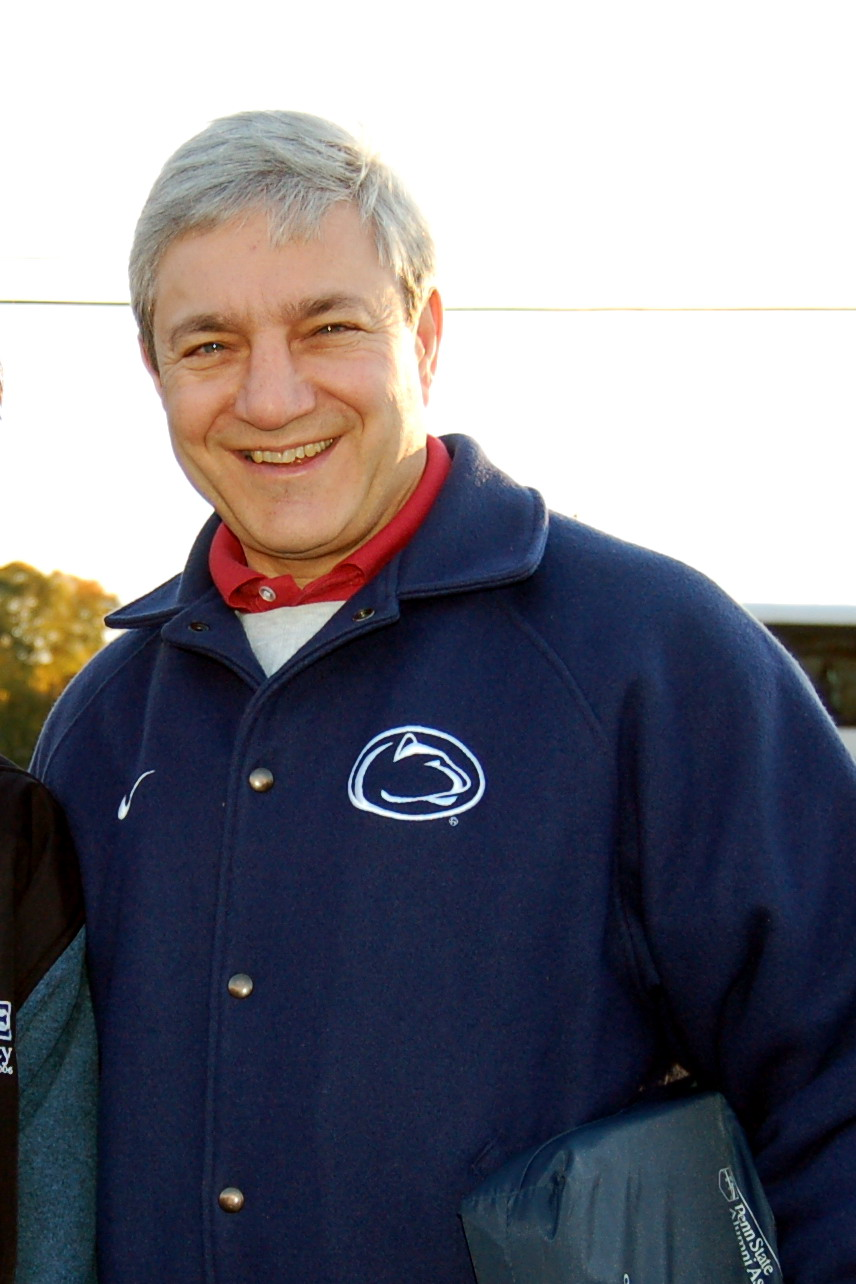

16th President of the Pennsylvania State University
- In office September 1, 1995 – November 9, 2011
- Preceded by: Joab Thomas
- Succeeded by: Rodney Erickson

17th Chancellor of the University of Nebraska–Lincoln
- In office October 31, 1991 – July 21, 1995
- Preceded by: Martin Massengale
- Succeeded by: James Moeser

Personal details
- Born: Graham Basil Spanier; July 18, 1948 (age 78) Cape Town, Union of South Africa
- Spouse: Sandra Spanier
- Children: 2
- Education: Iowa State University (BA), (MA); Northwestern University (PhD)

Graham Basil Spanier (born July 18, 1948) is a South African-born American sociologist and university administrator who became the 16th president of Pennsylvania State University on September 1, 1995. On November 9, 2011, in the wake of the Penn State child sex abuse scandal, Spanier and longtime football coach Joe Paterno were "removed from their positions" by the Penn State board of trustees.

Spanier is currently president emeritus and university professor emeritus. He previously held appointments as professor of human development and family studies; sociology, demography, and family and community medicine. He had a one-year post-presidential sabbatical leave following his resignation as president of Penn State in November 2011.

After lengthy criminal proceedings, Spanier was convicted of one misdemeanor charge of child endangerment in March 2017 for his role in the scandal. The conviction was overturned by a federal district judge in April 2019, but reinstated by an appeals court in December 2020. He served a two-month prison sentence throughout the summer of 2021.

Spanier has written a book recounting the Penn State scandal from his perspective, the criminal proceedings which followed and his resulting incarceration. "In the Lions’ Den: The Penn State Scandal and a Rush to Judgment" was released by Gryphon Eagle Press in September 2022.

== Early life and education ==
Graham Basil Spanier was born to Rosadele Lurie and Fritz Otto Spanier in Cape Town, South Africa and came to Chicago, US as an infant when his parents immigrated, concerned by parallels they saw between apartheid in South Africa and fascism in Germany. His father had previously escaped Nazi Germany in 1936; much of his father's extended family perished during the Holocaust.

The family moved to a working-class neighborhood on the south side of Chicago, living there until 1956. Spanier's father worked in a nuts, bolts and screws warehouse loading and unloading trucks; his mother worked in a clerical position. The family moved to the suburb of Highland Park, where Spanier graduated from Highland Park High School in 1966. His father became postmaster of Highland Park in 1962 and retired from that position in 1975.

Spanier has revealed that his father was physically violent with all three of his children. His sister Anita told The New York Times that Graham received the most violent beatings, leaving him with lifelong complications. "I've had to have four operations to correct serious deformities inside my head from beatings my father gave me," Spanier said. "They had to rebuild me from the inside out."

As a teenager, Spanier largely supported himself financially, working part-time jobs at a radio station, a children's clothing store, a legal office, and saving for college by mowing lawns and baby-sitting. He was president of J&A Radio Productions, a Junior Achievement company that produced a weekly show called "Variety" targeted to Chicago-area youth. Along with Brian Ross, he co-founded a radio news service that covered the 1968 Democratic National Convention in Chicago.

He attended Iowa State University, where he earned a bachelor's degree in sociology in three years (in 1969) and continued his education to earn a master's degree (1971). As a graduate student, he taught undergraduate classes in marriage and family sociology while on an assistantship.

During college, Spanier served as a head resident in the residence halls and worked in radio and television at WEEF (Chicago), KASI (Ames, Iowa) and WOI-TV (Ames, Iowa). He had summer jobs as a radio announcer, news director, pizza maker, bank teller and public relations officer. He received numerous honors while a university student for his leadership in student government and campus activities, including the Gold Key of the Cardinal Key Honor Society. Iowa State later honored him with the Distinguished Achievement Citation and an honorary doctorate (2004).

Following his graduation from Iowa State, Spanier attended Northwestern University, where he was a Woodrow Wilson Fellow, and earned his Ph.D. in sociology in 1973.

== Career ==
Prior to his tenure as president of Penn State, Spanier served as:

- Member of the Penn State faculty and served in three administrative positions in the College of Health and Human Development: professor of human development and family studies; sociology, demography; and family and community medicine (1973–82).
- Vice provost for undergraduate studies at Stony Brook University (1982–86)
- Provost and vice president for academic affairs at Oregon State University (1986–91)
- Chancellor of the University of Nebraska–Lincoln (1991–95)

=== 16th President of The Pennsylvania State University ===
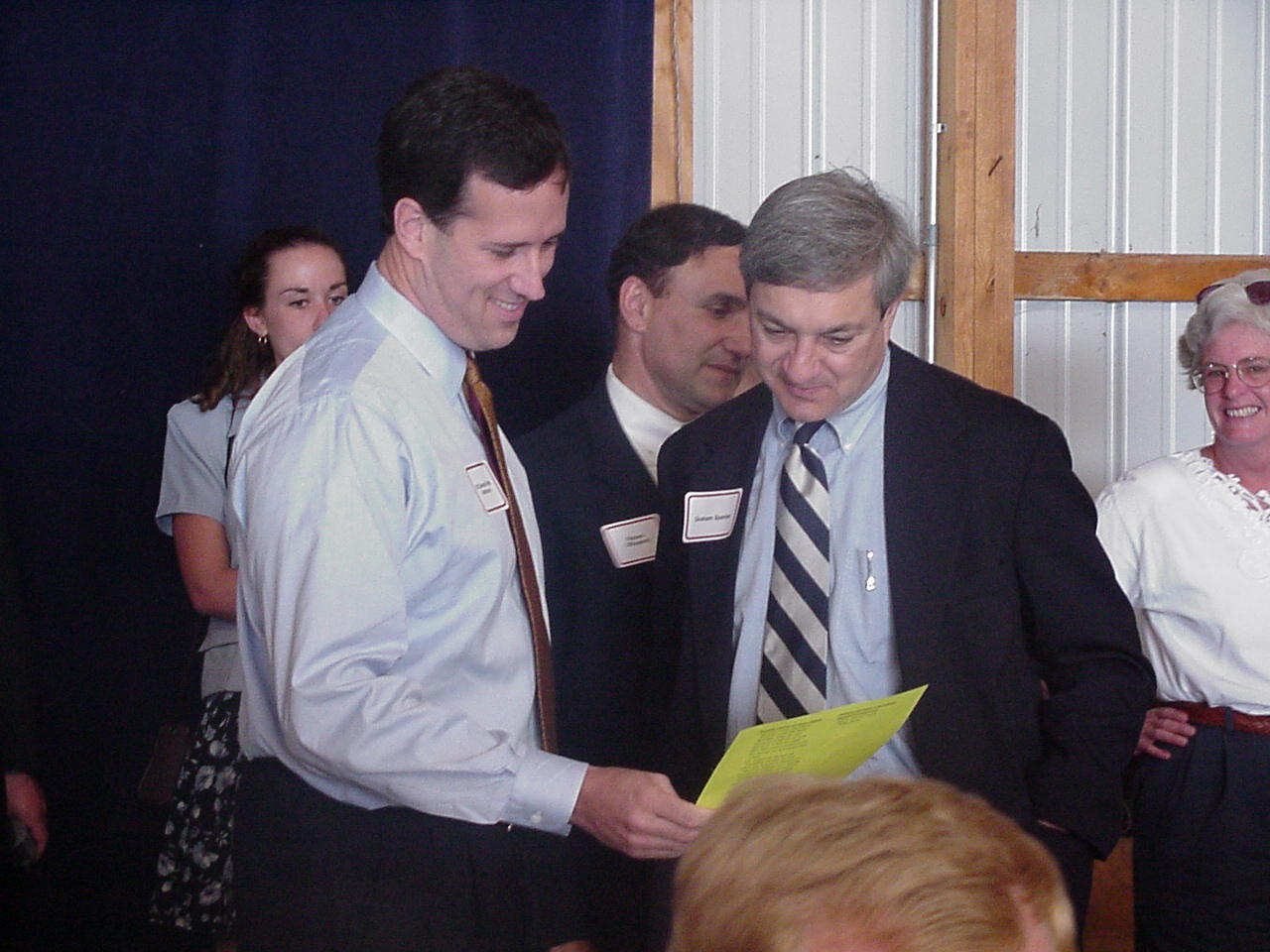
Spanier with Pennsylvania Senator Rick Santorum in 2000

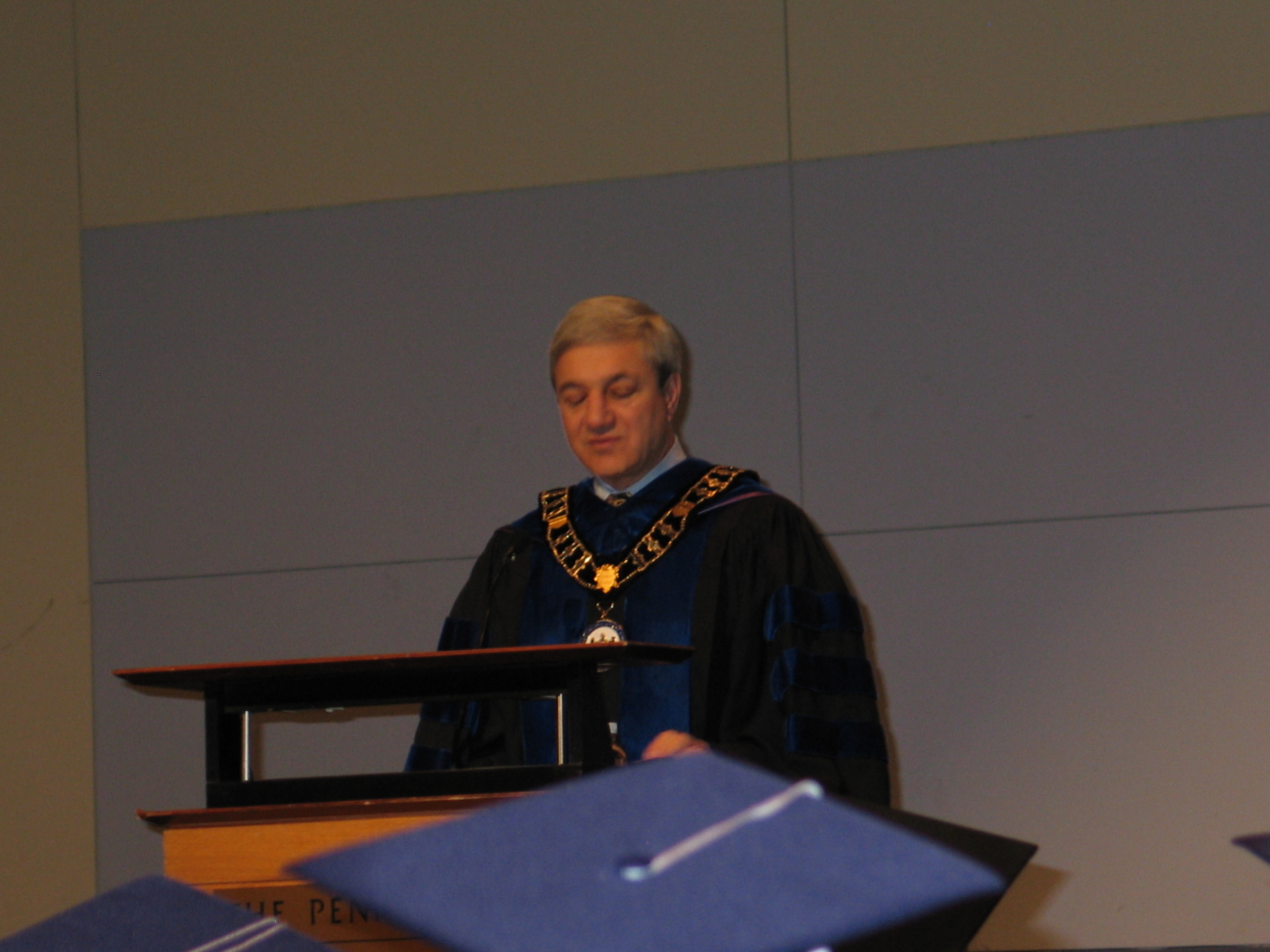
Spanier in 2005

During his presidency, Spanier set goals to make Penn State the "top student-centered research university in America" and for the university to lead the nation in "the integration of teaching, research, and service."

Spanier created the Penn State World Campus, the Schreyer Honors College, the Presidential Leadership Academy, the College of Information Sciences and Technology, the School of International Affairs, and programs in forensic sciences and security and risk analysis. He oversaw the merger with the Dickinson School of Law, creating an accredited and acclaimed two-campus law school. He was recognized by the American Institute of Architects for "Outstanding Contribution to the Profession by a Non-Architect" (2006) and with the Elizabeth Holtzman Award for his improvements to campus landscaping, master planning, and community relations.

During his tenure, applications exceeded 120,000 per year, enrollment grew to 97,000, and the academic standing of dozens of programs rose in national and international rankings.

As president, Spanier made a commitment to spend time with students. He performed with Penn State's Musical Theatre students and occasionally with Penn State's marching band, the Glee Club, and the Chamber Orchestra. He and his racquetball partner were 11-time Penn State co-ed intramural racquetball champions. He hosted "To the Best of My Knowledge," a live call-in program on public television and radio, and "Expert Opinion," a sports topic television program on the Big Ten Network.

=== Board memberships ===
Schreyer Honors College Dean Christian Brady (left) and Graham Spanier (right), at the Schreyer Honors College medal ceremony on December 17, 2010.

Spanier has served as a board member for the following national boards of directors/trustees:

- Association of American Universities, where he served as chair, 2007–08
- Association of State Universities and Land-Grant Colleges, where he served as chair, 2001–02
- Big Ten Conference Council of Presidents/Chancellors, where he served as chair
- National Collegiate Athletic Association Division I, where he served as chair and was a member of the Association's executive committee, 1997–2001
- Kellogg Commission on the Future of State and Land-Grant Universities for the Association of Public and Land-grant Universities, where he served as chair, 1996–2000
- University Corporation for Advanced Internet Development (Internet2), where he was a founding member, 1997–2000
- Child Fund International (formerly Christian Children's Fund), 1985–94; chair, 1992–94
- Worldwide Universities Network, where he served as a founding member and vice-chair, 2000–07
- National 4-H Council, 1997–2000
- National Council on Family Relations, where he served as president from 1987 to 1988
- Universities Research Association, 2001–05
- Business Higher Education Forum, 2005–11
- Council on Competitiveness, 1998–2011
- United States Department of Education Commission on Opportunity in Athletics], 2002–03
- Presidential Policy Advisory Board on Information Technology, chair, 1997–99
- Joint Commission on Accountability Reporting in Higher Education, 1994–97
- Association of Academic Health Centers Council on Health Sciences and the university, where he served as co-chair, 1996–99
- Joint Committee on Higher Education and the Entertainment Communities, where he served as co-chair, 2002–06
- National Security Higher Education Advisory Board, where he served as chair, 2005–11
- United States Steel Corporation, where he served as independent director and was a member of both the Audit Committee and the Corporate Governance & Public Policy Committee, 2008–11
- Citizens Financial Group, where he served as director, 2002–11
- National Counterintelligence Working Group, 2005–11
- Junior Achievement Worldwide, where he served on the Board of Governors, 2003–2011
- FM Global Insurance Company, where he served as director, 2010–12
- Bowl Championship Series, where he served as chair of the Presidential Oversight Committee

In addition, Spanier served on the board of advisers for the President at the Naval Postgraduate School and Naval War College.

== Penn State child sex abuse scandal ==
=== Resignation from Penn State ===
During the investigation into allegations of child sex abuse by former Penn State football defensive coordinator Jerry Sandusky, dozens of individuals were interviewed by prosecutors, and many were called to testify before a Grand Jury. Those interviewed included Penn State football coaches, staff members and university administrators. Among them were Senior Vice President Gary Schultz, Athletic Director Timothy Curley, Spanier and Head Football Coach Joe Paterno, whose testimony lasted seven minutes. As a result of grand jury testimony, Curley and Schultz were charged with perjury and failure to report suspected child abuse.

Spanier issued a statement the day the charges came to light in which he said Curley and Schultz had his "complete confidence", and they "operate at the highest levels of honesty." Spanier was criticized for expressing support for Curley and Schultz, and failing to express any concern for Sandusky's alleged victims. After this, he largely dropped from public view. According to the Chronicle of Higher Education, the Board of Trustees ordered him to keep silent. Paterno's son, Jay Paterno, reported that the board of trustees chair, John P. Surma, then ordered that Coach Paterno's weekly press conference be canceled.

On Nov. 6, 2011, a Facebook group titled “Fire Graham Spanier” was created by a Penn State alumnus to pressure the board of trustees. The group never achieved more than 100 members. Also on Facebook, an event titled "Sit in Silence during the Alma Mater" encouraged attendees of the final home football game of the season on Saturday, Nov. 12 to sit in silence while the Penn State Blue Band performed the Alma Mater. An online petition calling for Spanier's removal was created at change.org garnered over 1,800 signatures in four days before closing.

At emergency meetings on Nov 5 and 6, Spanier briefed the board of trustees. The board decided that they alone wanted to manage the unfolding crisis. On the night of November 9, the board announced that Spanier had resigned and Paterno had been fired — in both cases, effective immediately. Several Penn State sources told StateCollege.com and The Patriot-News of Harrisburg that Spanier and Board of Trustees vice chairman John Surma mutually agreed that the best way forward for all involved would be for Spanier to resign "voluntarily and with grace." Other sources said the decision was not entirely voluntary; earlier that day The Express-Times of Easton reported the Board of Trustees had given Spanier an ultimatum—resign before that night's meeting or be fired. A member of the board later told The Morning Call of Allentown that the board was very angry about his statement of unconditional support for Curley and Schultz. ABC News reported that Spanier had submitted a letter of resignation earlier in the day on Nov. 9. Provost Rodney Erickson was named his successor.

In the wake of the Sandusky investigation, a Phoenix, Arizona private investigator named Paul McLaughlin publicly alleged he had been sexually abused by Penn State Professor John R. Neisworth and two other men in the late 1970s and early 1980s. McLaughlin claimed to possess a tape of telephone conversations with university officials, including Spanier, to verify that he had tried twenty years later to inform the university, but he later had to file an affidavit acknowledging that he did not have such tapes. The charges filed against Neisworth and the two other men in 2005 were dropped that same year for lack of evidence.

=== The Freeh Report and related lawsuits ===
In November 2011 the Penn State Board of Trustees hired former FBI Director Louis Freeh to conduct an external investigation into the handling of the Sandusky matter. Released on July 12, 2012, the Freeh report concluded that Spanier, Curley, Schultz and Paterno "concealed Sandusky's activities from the Board of Trustees, the University community and authorities." In addition, the report said the four men "exhibited a striking lack of empathy for Sandusky's victims by failing to inquire as to their safety and well-being" and that they allowed him "to have continued, unrestricted and unsupervised access to the University's facilities and affiliation with the University's prominent football program." Spanier and his attorneys disputed the accuracy of Freeh's findings, alleging it contained "many, many errors."

A later report commissioned by the Paterno family by former U.S. Attorney General and former Governor of Pennsylvania Dick Thornburgh, concluded that the Freeh report was "seriously flawed" and a "failure." Freeh's firm was reportedly paid $6.5 million by the Penn State trustees to compile the report. Subsequent billings have raised the amount to $8.2 million. A ruling by an arbitrator for the State Employee Retirement System, in an appeal pertaining to the revocation of Sandusky's pension in June 2014, also called into serious question the credibility of the Freeh Report.

Earlier that month, on July 11, one year after the release of the Freeh report, Spanier's attorneys filed a lawsuit against Freeh and Freeh's firm, Sporkin & Sullivan, citing slander, libel and defamation. The suit demanded monetary damages and a jury trial. In two rulings in Centre County Court, and in a subsequent appeal to the Pennsylvania Superior Court, Freeh's efforts to force Spanier to file the details of his formal complaint were turned down as premature. On February 25, 2014, over the objections of Louis Freeh and his law firm, Spanier was granted a stay in his defamation lawsuit until his criminal case is resolved.

On February 10, 2016, Spanier filed separate lawsuits against Freeh and Penn State, claiming university trustees and Freeh colluded in placing blame for Sandusky's alleged sexual misconduct on lack of action by Paterno, Schultz, Curley and Spanier. Spanier seeks a damage judgment against Freeh for defamation, and against the university for breaching terms agreed to upon his resignation in 2011.

=== Criminal charges ===
On November 1, 2012, Pennsylvania Attorney General Linda Kelly announced that Spanier had been indicted for grand jury perjury, obstruction of justice, child endangerment, failure to report child abuse and conspiracy in connection with the scandal. The charges were partially based on findings in the Freeh report. Curley and Schultz were also indicted for these charges in a superseding indictment. On July 30, 2013, the charges formally moved ahead following a preliminary hearing by District Judge William Wenner.

Pretrial hearings in the case against Spanier began on December 17, 2013. Dauphin County Judge Todd Hoover ruled at that time that Spanier's attorneys would not be allowed to call to the stand Cynthia Baldwin. Baldwin, who had been an attorney for Penn State, had accompanied Spanier, Schultz and Curley to their grand jury appearances in 2011. All three men would testify they believed Baldwin was their legal representation. Later, under the protection of a proffer agreement—a form of immunity—with the attorney general, Baldwin testified against the three men in her grand jury testimony. Attorneys for Spanier, Curley and Schultz asserted this was a violation of attorney-client privilege and their clients' civil rights. Elizabeth Ainslie, one of Spanier's attorneys, said, "I was never notified that Ms. Baldwin was going to testify against Graham Spanier, and neither was he. [Baldwin] says different things at different times about who she represented."

On January 22, 2016, a three judge panel of the Pennsylvania Superior Court unanimously overturned a decision by Judge Hoover and threw out charges of perjury, obstruction and conspiracy against Spanier and Schultz, and charges of obstruction and conspiracy against Curley. The court found that Baldwin breached attorney-client privilege by testifying as to confidential communications between her and Spanier to the grand jury.

=== Trial and conviction ===
Shortly before their cases were to go to trial, Curley and Schultz accepted plea deals for one misdemeanor count each of endangering the welfare of children. Spanier refused a similar deal and went to trial on March 20, 2017, on two counts of endangering the welfare of children and one charge alleging conspiracy with Curley and Schultz to cover up a molestation allegation against Sandusky; both Curley and Schultz testified at Spanier's trial. On March 24, Spanier was found not guilty of the conspiracy charge and one of the endangerment counts. He was, however, found guilty of one count of endangerment in a split verdict. His attorney indicated they would appeal the guilty verdict.

On June 2, 2017, Spanier was sentenced to two months jail and two months house arrest. Additionally, Spanier was ordered to pay a $7,500 fine and perform 200 hours of community service. Curley and Schultz began serving their sentences on July 15, but Spanier remained free while he appealed his conviction. On June 26, 2018, his appeal to the Superior Court was rejected by a vote of two to one. One of Spanier's attorneys said that Spanier would pursue a further appeal.

On April 30, 2019, one day before Spanier was to have reported to Centre County Correctional Facility to begin serving a two-month sentence, his conviction was overturned. U.S. Magistrate Judge Karoline Mehalchick ruled the conviction "was based on a criminal statute that did not go into effect until six years after the conduct in question, and is therefore in violation of Spanier’s federal constitutional rights.”

On December 1, 2020, Spanier's conviction was reinstated by the United States Court of Appeals for the Third District.

On May 27, 2021, Spanier was handed an order to begin serving two months at the county jail on July 9, followed by two months of house arrest, for a misdemeanor conviction of endangering the welfare of children. He was convicted by a jury in March 2017 but he remained out of jail due to appeals.

On June 5, 2021, The Harrisburg (Pennsylvania) Patriot-News published a letter from Richard Black of Susquehanna, Pennsylvania. Black wrote, “As foreman of the jury that convicted Dr. Graham Spanier, I have carried (since then) the burden that the verdict was a gross miscarriage of justice! At the time, I voiced this privately with the friends and associates. It was my hope and prayer that the verdict would be set aside on appeal and that justice would prevail. Now I see that a jail term has been imposed and I can no longer remain silent. It is my firm and considered opinion that the prosecution of Dr. Spanier must end forthwith!”

On June 7, 2021, Spanier was incarcerated at Centre County Correctional Facility in Bellefonte, PA.

On August 4, 2021, Spanier was released from Centre County Correctional Facility after serving 58 days of his 60-day sentence. His sentence stipulates that he will serve two months of house confinement and complete 200 hours of community service.

=== "In the Lions' Den" ===
Following his incarceration, Spanier completed writing his account of the Sandusky case and its aftermath. In the Lions’ Den: The Penn State Scandal and a Rush to Judgment was published in September 2022 by Gryphon/Eagle Press.

A review of the book in Library Journal states that Spanier's memoir “... refutes the highly disputed report prepared by former FBI director Louis Freeh…. Using evidence obtained through freedom of information laws and other sources, the author documents how many of his accusers have since been discredited and makes a convincing case of his innocence.”

Edward Rendell, former Pennsylvania governor, wrote a testimonial for Spanier's account, saying “It is undeniable that this book raises real questions about our justice system.” John H. Kramer, former executive director of the Pennsylvania Commission on Sentencing and former staff director of the United States Sentencing Commission, called it “... a must read for understanding the depth to which justice can fall…."

== Selected publications ==
Spanier has published more than 100 scholarly publications, including 10 books. He was the founding editor of the Journal of Family Issues, an associate editor of the Journal of Marriage and the Family, and a member of the editorial advisory board of the Journal of Marriage and Family Counseling. Among his most cited publications are:

- Graham B. Spanier (1976). "Measuring Dyadic Adjustment: New Scales for Assessing the Quality of Marriage and Similar Dyads". Journal of Marriage and the Family 38: 15–28.
- Graham B. Spanier and Paul C. Glick (1980). "Mate Selection Differentials Between Whites and Blacks in the United States". Social Forces 58: 707–725.
- Graham B. Spanier and Robert A. Lewis (1980). "Marital Quality: A Review of the Seventies". Journal of Marriage and the Family 42: 825–839.
- Graham B. Spanier and Frank F. Furstenberg Jr. (1982). "Remarriage after Divorce: A Longitudinal Analysis of Well-Being". Journal of Marriage and the Family 44: 709–720.
- Graham B. Spanier (1983). "Married and Unmarried Cohabitation in the United States: 1980". Journal of Marriage and the Family 45: 277–288.

== Personal life ==
Spanier and his wife Sandra have two children. Sandra Spanier is a professor of English and Women's Studies at Penn State and the general editor of The Cambridge Edition of the Letters of Ernest Hemingway.

In 2019, Spanier had heart surgery. As of 2020, he suffers from an advanced stage of prostate cancer.
