= James Moeser =

American musician and university administrator (born 1939)

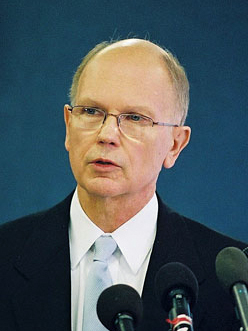
- James Moeser (Jim Wallace, 2002)

9th Chancellor of the University of North Carolina at Chapel Hill
- In office 2000–2008
- Preceded by: Michael Hooker
- Succeeded by: Holden Thorp

18th Chancellor of the University of Nebraska–Lincoln
- In office February 1, 1996 – January 1, 2000
- Preceded by: Graham Spanier
- Succeeded by: Harvey Perlman

Personal details
- Born: April 3, 1939 (age 87) Colorado City, Texas
- Spouse: Susan Dickerson Moeser
- Education: University of Texas at Austin; University of Michigan
- Profession: Educator

James Charles Moeser (born April 3, 1939) is an American musician and university administrator who served as the ninth chancellor of the University of North Carolina at Chapel Hill. He is a trained concert organist. A native of Colorado City, Texas, Moeser earned bachelor's and master's degrees in music from the University of Texas at Austin and a doctorate from the University of Michigan.

Moeser, formerly chancellor of the University of Nebraska–Lincoln, began his work as chancellor at UNC on August 15, 2000. While at UNC he oversaw and introduced many historic changes and improvements for the university, including the Carolina Covenant, Carolina First campaign, Carolina Connects initiative, expansions of genome research at the university, and the passing of a referendum for the nation's largest higher education bond package. Moeser announced on September 26, 2007 that he would relinquish his position as Chancellor on June 30, 2008. He was succeeded by Holden Thorp on June 30, 2008. Following a year-long sabbatical, Moeser returned to UNC as Chancellor Emeritus and professor in the music department.
