= Fred Luehring =

American sports coach and administrator (1882–1981)

Biographical details
- Born: 1881; Hanover, Kansas, U.S.
- Died: February 1, 1981 (aged 99); Ridley Park, Pennsylvania, U.S.
- Education: Chicago (Ph.M. 1907)

Playing career

Football
- 1901–1904: North Central (IL)
- 1905: Chicago

Basketball
- 1905–1906: Chicago
- Position: End (football)

Coaching career (HC unless noted)

Football
- 1906–1909: Ripon

Basketball
- 1906–1910: Ripon
- 1913–1920: Princeton

Baseball
- 1907–1912: Ripon

Swimming
- 1921–1922: Nebraska

Administrative career (AD unless noted)
- 1906–1910: Ripon
- c. 1918: Princeton (acting AD)
- 1920–1922: Nebraska
- 1922–1930: Minnesota
- 1932: US Olympic Swimming Committee

Head coaching record
- Overall: 21–3–1 (football); 125–61 (basketball); 11–6–1 (baseball)

Frederick William Luehring (1882 – February 1, 1981) was an American football, basketball, baseball, and swimming coach college athletics administrator. He served as the head football coach at Ripon College in Ripon, Wisconsin from 1906 to 1909, compiling a record of 20–3–1. Luehring was the head basketball coach at Ripon from 1906 to 1910 and at Princeton University from 1913 to 1920, amassing a career college basketball coaching mark of 125–61.

Luehring was credited with starting the swim team at the University of Nebraska in 1921 and later served as a committee member of the US Olympic Swimming team.

As a college athlete, Luehring excelled at North Central University and then at the University of Chicago under head coach Amos Alonzo Stagg.

In addition to his athletic pursuits Luehring also was an art collector. A selection of prints by Honore Daumier of people swimming were exhibited at Lehigh University Art Gallery in 1958 with the assistance of Head Curator Francis Quirk.

Luehring died at the age of 99, on February 1, 1981, at Taylor Hospital in Ridley Park, Pennsylvania.

== Head coaching record ==
=== Football ===
Year	Team	Overall	Conference	Standing	Bowl/playoffs
Ripon Crimson (Independent) (1906–1909)
1906	Ripon	5–0–1			
1907	Ripon	5–2			
1908	Ripon	5–0			
1909	Ripon	6–1			
Ripon:		21–3–1			
Total:		21–3–1			
