= University of Nebraska College of Law =

Law school in Lincoln, Nebraska

Coordinates: 40°49′51″N 96°39′37″W

Nebraska College of Law
- Parent school: University of Nebraska–Lincoln
- Established: 1888; 138 years ago
- School type: Public law school
- Parent endowment: $2.53 billion (2024)
- Dean: Richard Moberly
- Location: Lincoln, Nebraska, United States
- Enrollment: 444 (2025)
- Faculty: 34 (full-time); 60 (part-time)
- USNWR ranking: T–71st (2025)
- Bar pass rate: 98.1% (first-time takers in 2021)
- Website: law.unl.edu
- ABA profile: Standard 509 Report

The University of Nebraska College of Law is the law school of the University of Nebraska–Lincoln, a public research university in Lincoln, Nebraska. It was founded in 1888 as Central Law College and became part of the University of Nebraska in 1891. Richard Moberly has served as dean since 2016.

The college administers a traditional Juris Doctor, a joint master's degree and J. D. program, and a concentrated J. D. or part-time L. L. M. degree in Space, Cyber, and National Security Law. It offers an optional "3–3" format, allowing undergraduates to obtain a bachelor's degree and J. D. in six years rather than the standard seven.

Notable alumni include John J. Pershing, commander of the American Expeditionary Forces during World War I; John R. McCarl, the first U. S. Comptroller General; and U. S. Solicitor General J. Lee Rankin, as well as many who served as state governors, White House Counsel, or national and state judges. In 2024, 94.0 percent of graduates seeking employment were employed in a bar passage-required role within ten months of graduation.

== History ==
=== Early years ===
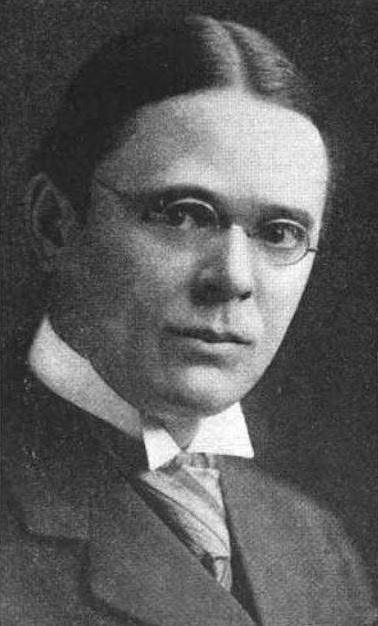
Roscoe Pound served as dean from 1903 to 1907

The University of Nebraska's original 1869 charter included a law school, but one was not established until 1891 when the university absorbed Central Law College, which had been founded in 1889 as the state's first college of law. Early leadership believed in lecture as the primary form of teaching, with little case study and, in the opinion of many within the school, disappointing results.

Roscoe Pound became dean in 1903 and led a reorganization of the college in the model of what he called the "Harvard system," focusing on a case method approach to education and adding a third year of curriculum. The college became a charter member of the Association of American Law Schools in 1905. Pound departed after four years as dean, later serving in the same role at Harvard Law School.

Along with most of NU's early departments, the College of Law was originally based in University Hall. In 1912, it was moved to the new Law College building on the western edge of campus, the first of many university buildings designed by architect Ellery L. Davis. The College of Law received accreditation from the American Bar Association in 1923, and remained largely unchanged prior to the outbreak of World War II.

=== Postwar growth ===
The College of Law closed for three years during World War II; fears the closure would be made permanent were alleviated when the school reopened in January 1946 with an entirely new faculty under dean Frederick Beutel. The college added a fourth year to its curriculum (later reverted to three years) and began training students for public as well as private practice, a change that many law schools made over a decade earlier. David Dow, one of the new faculty brought on after the war, became dean in 1960 and began an aggressive expansion of the college, more than doubling enrollment by 1970 to nearly 300.

During this span, The Nebraska Transcript became the College of Law's first newspaper. It was published three times per year until changing to two in 1996, also the final year it was run by students, as the college assumed editorial control in 1997.

The program soon outgrew the Law College building and moved to a 102-000-square-foot facility on NU's East Campus that was originally given the same name. It was dedicated in honor of donor Ross McCollum in 1978, while the original building was incorporated into Architecture Hall. Harvey Perlman became dean in 1983, remaining in a full-time teaching position for most of his fifteen-year tenure.

=== 21st century ===
Perlman was named chancellor of the University of Nebraska–Lincoln in 2000, after which the university undertook a significant expansion and renovation of McCollum Hall that lasted for most of the decade. In the late 2000s, a group of NU students determined there was a "void of scholarly journals that discussed and criticized Nebraska and Eighth Circuit law" and resurrected the Nebraska Law Review Bulletin, which had been established in 1922 as the Nebraska Law Bulletin to critique regional law. Though similar, it is separate from the Nebraska Law Review, the college's official student-run journal which comments on national and international law.

Richard Moberly became dean in 2016, at the same time the college was beginning efforts to overhaul its curriculum to adapt to a rapidly changing legal landscape.

== Academics ==
=== Admission ===
In fall 2023, the college accepted 62.1 percent of its 718 applicants, with 20.8 percent of those accepted enrolling. The twenty-fifth and seventy-fifth percentile LSAT scores for enrollees were 154 and 161, with an average of 158. The twenty-fifth and seventy-fifth percentile undergraduate GPAs for enrollees were 3.44 and 3.96, with an average of 3.77.

=== Rankings ===
The 2025 U.S. News & World Report law school rankings placed Nebraska tied for seventy-first of 195 American Bar Association-accredited law schools. A 2016 Business Insider ranking, which focused on job placement rather than selectivity or reputation, ranked Nebraska forty-fourth.

Nebraska has regularly placed in the top five nationally in value-based rankings of American law schools.

=== Costs ===
Costs for the 2024–25 academic year were $434 per credit hour for Nebraska residents and $1,170 per credit hour for out-of-state students; both were required to make an annual payment of $3,530. For a standard school year, tuition fees are approximately $16,550 per year for residents and $38,630 per year for non-residents.

== Employment ==
Approximately eight-nine percent of the school's 2024 graduates were placed in bar passage-required jobs within ten months of graduation, with an additional four percent in J. D.-advantaged jobs, according to Nebraska's official 2024 ABA-required disclosures.

Employment summary for 2024 graduates
Employment status	Percentage
Employed – bar passage required	88.8%
Employed – J. D. advantage	3.9%
Employed – professional position	0.7%
Employed – other position	2.6%
Enrolled in graduate studies	1.3%
Unemployed – not seeking	0.0%
Unemployed – seeking	2.0%
Employment status unknown	0.0%
Total of 153 graduates

== People ==
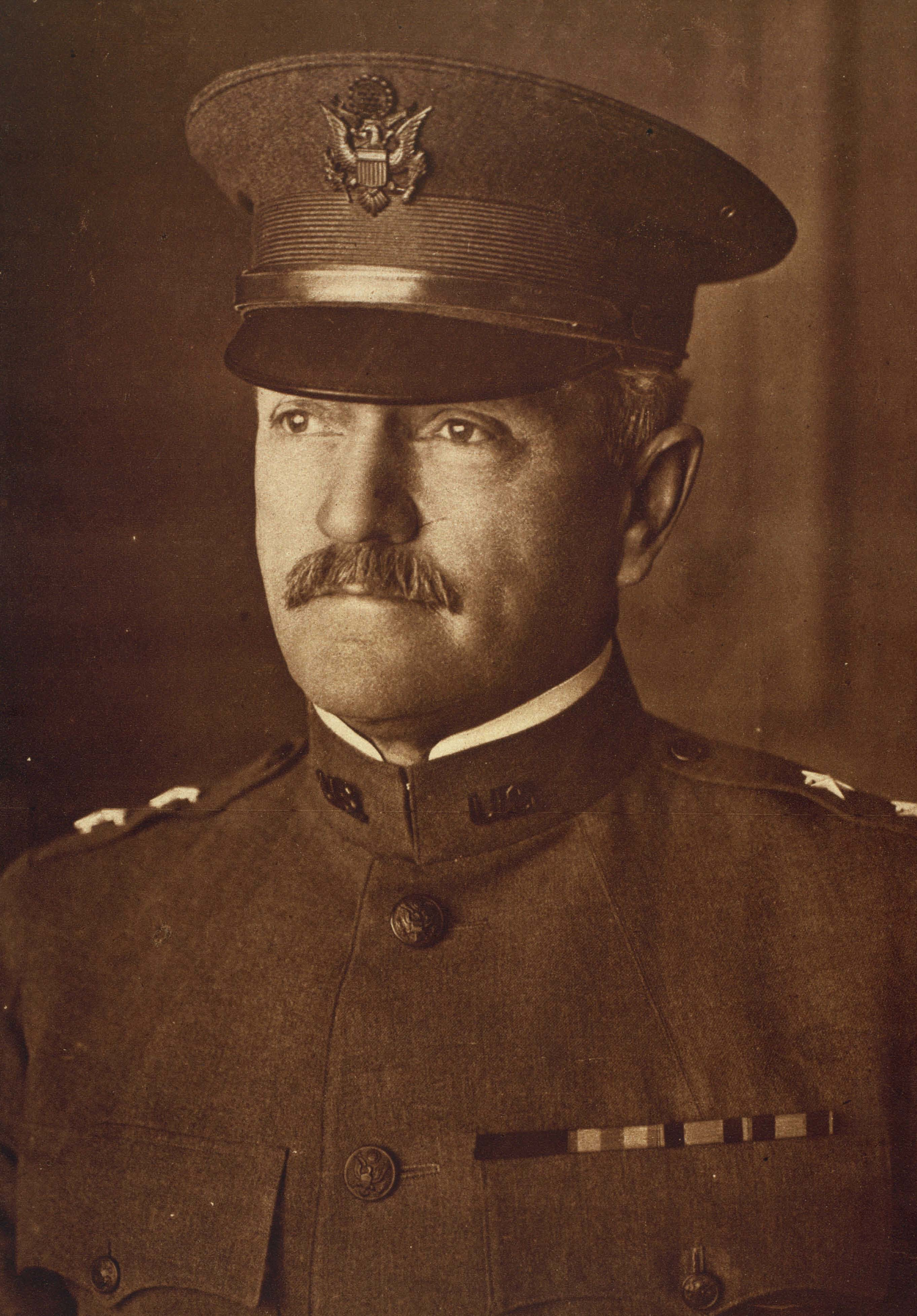
John J. Pershing graduated from the College of Law in 1893

=== Deans ===
No.	Dean	Tenure
1	William Smith	1891–1893
2	Manoah B. Reese	1893–1903
3	Roscoe Pound	1903–1907
4	George P. Costigan	1907–1909
5	William B. Hastings	1909–1920
6	Warren A. Seavey	1920–1926
7	Henry Hubbard Foster	1926–1945
8	Frederick K. Beutel	1945–1950
9	Edmund O. Belsheim	1950–1960
10	David Dow	1960–1966
11	Henry M. Gather	1966–1977
12	John W. Strong	1977–1983
13	Harvey Perlman	1983–1998
14	Nancy B. Rapoport	1998–2001
15	Steven Willborn	2001–2010
16	Susan Poser	2010–2016
17	Richard Moberly	2016–present

=== Notable alumni ===
- John J. Pershing (L. L. B. 1893) – commander of the American Expeditionary Forces
- John R. McCarl (L. L. B. 1903) – first Comptroller General of the United States
- J. Lee Rankin (L. L. B. 1930) – Solicitor General of the United States
- Ted Sorensen (L. L. B. 1949) – White House Counsel to John F. Kennedy
- Stanley K. Hathaway (L. L. B. 1950) – U. S. Secretary of the Interior and governor of Wyoming
- Lee C. White (L. L. B. 1953) – White House Counsel to Lyndon B. Johnson
- Clayton Yeutter (J. D. 1963) – U.S. Secretary of Agriculture and Counselor to the President
- C. Arlen Beam (J. D. 1965) – judge of Court of Appeals for the Eighth Circuit
- Ben Nelson (J. D. 1970) – governor of Nebraska
- William J. Riley (J. D. 1972) – chief judge of Court of Appeals for the Eighth Circuit
- L. Steven Grasz (J. D. 1989) – judge of the Court of Appeals for the Eighth Circuit

=== Notable faculty ===
- Richard Dooling, novelist and screenwriter
- Roger Kirst, professor
- David Landis, politician
- Frederick D. Losey, Shakespearian scholar and elocutionist
- Harvey Perlman, college administrator
- Roscoe Pound, legal scholar and educator
- William J. Riley, judge of Court of Appeals for the Eighth Circuit
