= Joseph Soshnik =

American academic administrator (1889–1986)

13th Chancellor of the University of Nebraska–Lincoln
- In office November 1, 1968 – June 30, 1971
- Preceded by: Clifford M. Hardin
- Succeeded by: James Zumberge

Personal details
- Born: Joseph Soshnik; February 14, 1920 Omaha, Nebraska, U.S.
- Died: November 22, 2002 (aged 82) St. Louis, Missouri, U.S.
- Resting place: Chesed Shel Emeth Cemetery
- Spouse: Miriam Saks
- Children: 3
- Education: Creighton University (BBA, MPA); University of Nebraska–Lincoln (Ph.D.)

Joseph Soshnik (February 14, 1920 – November 22, 2002) was an American academic administrator who was President of the University of Nebraska–Lincoln from 1968 to 1971.

== Early life ==
Soshnik was born on February 14, 1920. He was raised in Omaha, Nebraska and graduated from Omaha Central High School. He attended Creighton University, where he earned his bachelor of business administration in 1941 and his master of public administration in 1943. He served as an intelligence officer in the United States Navy during World War II and was stationed in Washington, D.C. and the Southwest Pacific.

== Career ==
Soshnik joined the Creighton faculty in 1946. In 1952, he earned his Ph.D. in business and finance at the University of Nebraska. That same year, he was appointed controller of Creighton University. In this role, he oversaw the university's budget and financial reporting. As it was a part-time position, he continued to teach full-time.

In 1957, Soshnik became controller at the University of Nebraska. He became Nebraska's vice-chancellor in charge of business and finance in 1962 and vice-chancellor for administration in 1966. He also served as co-interim athletic director (with the dean of the College of Business Administration, Charles Miller) from 1961 to 1962.

In 1968, Nebraska–Lincoln chancellor Clifford M. Hardin was selected to run the University of Nebraska system and he appointed Soshnik to run the University of Nebraska–Lincoln. Soshnik's tenure began in the midst of a transition for the universities of Nebraska, as well as a period of turmoil across many United States campuses as students protested American involvement in the Vietnam War. At Nebraska, this included a student takeover of the ROTC building on May 4, 1970, when a crowd of nearly two thousand protesters and onlookers gathered on campus hours after the Kent State shootings. Administration responded to protests by meeting and negotiating with student leaders, and as a result, no Vietnam War protests at the University of Nebraska–Lincoln became violent or required a National Guard intervention. Student leaders later praised Soshnik and anti-war professor Paul Olson for maintaining communication and allowing students to "vent their frustrations." Minor protests were held in January 1971 when President Richard Nixon visited Lincoln to honor the school's national championship-winning football team. Nebraska won its second consecutive national title the following year, in the process defeating archrival Oklahoma 35–31 in what was dubbed "The Game of the Century".

Soshnik resigned in 1971 to accept a position at Kirkpatrick, Pettis, Smith, Polian, an Omaha investment firm. He served as vice-president in charge of municipal finance and was later promoted to executive vice president and chairman of the executive committee.

== Personal life ==
Soshnik and his wife, Miriam had three sons. One son, Allan, and his wife Barbara, were killed in the MGM Grand fire. Soshnik was Jewish.

== Death ==
Soshnik died on November 22, 2002 in St. Louis. He was interred at the Chesed Shel Emeth Cemetery.
