= Clifford M. Hardin =

American politician (1915–2010)

Clifford Hardin
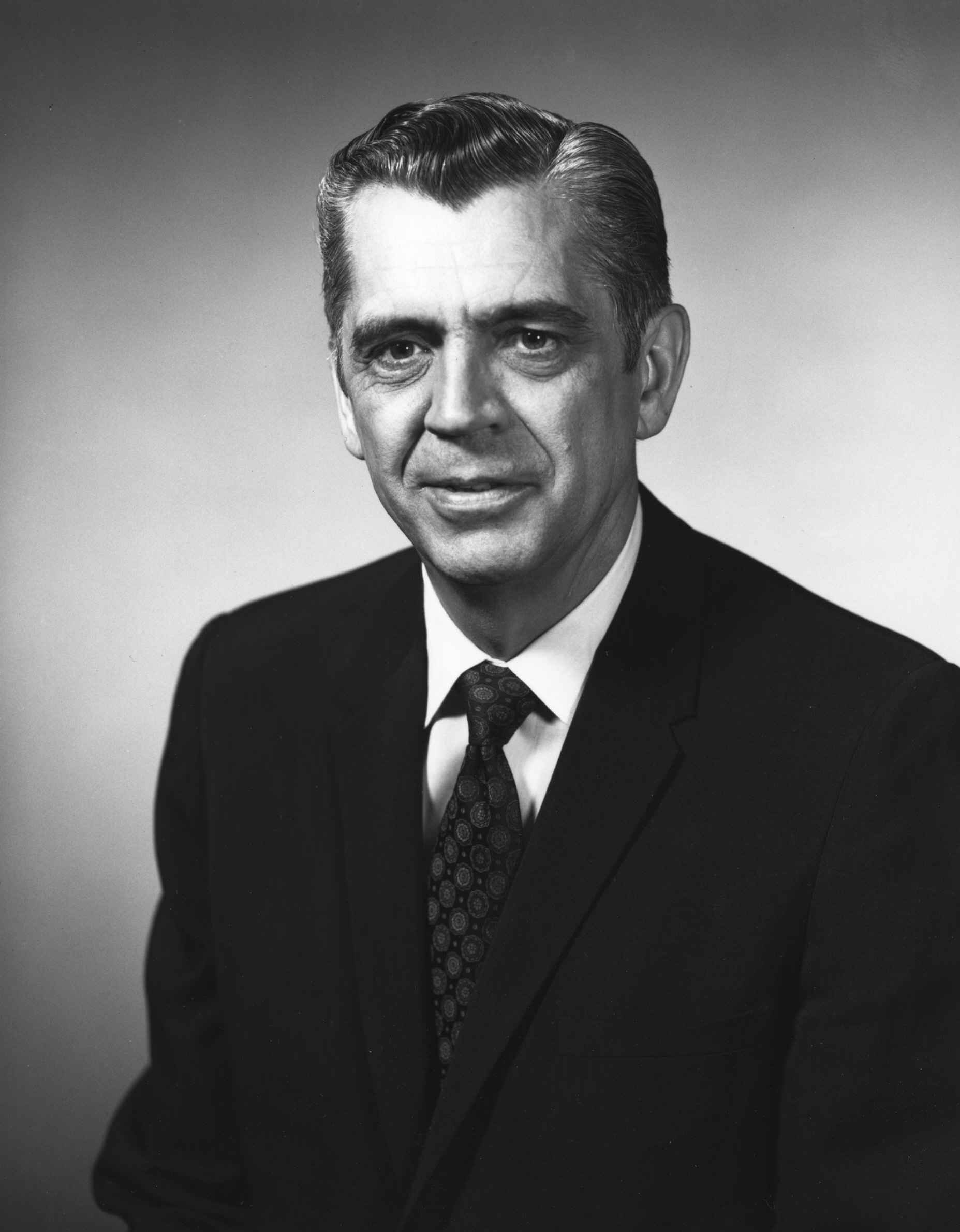

17th United States Secretary of Agriculture
- In office January 21, 1969 – November 17, 1971
- President: Richard Nixon
- Preceded by: Orville Freeman
- Succeeded by: Earl Butz

1st and 12th Chancellor of the University of Nebraska System
- In office November 1, 1968 – January 20, 1969
- Preceded by: Position established
- Succeeded by: Durwood B. Varner
- In office July 1, 1954 – October 31, 1968
- Preceded by: Reuben G. Gustavson
- Succeeded by: Joseph Soshnik

Personal details
- Born: October 9, 1915 Knightstown, Indiana, U.S.
- Died: April 4, 2010 (aged 94) Lincoln, Nebraska, U.S.
- Party: Republican
- Spouse: Martha Wood
- Children: 5
- Education: Purdue University, West Lafayette (BS, MS, PhD)

Clifford Morris Hardin (October 9, 1915 – April 4, 2010) was an American politician who served as the first president of the University of Nebraska. He served as the United States secretary of agriculture from 1969 to 1971 under President Richard Nixon.

== Biography ==
Hardin was born in Knightstown, Indiana, on October 9, 1915, to J. Alvin and Mabel (née Macy) Hardin. He earned a B.S. (1937), M.S. (1939) and Ph.D. (1941) from Purdue University in West Lafayette, Indiana. On June 28, 1939, Hardin married the former Martha Love Wood. They had two sons and three daughters.

He taught Agricultural Economics at the Michigan State University of Lansing from 1944 to 1948, when he became the assistant director and then the director of the Agricultural Experiment Station. He did some post-doctoral work during the 1940s at the University of Chicago where he did research in agricultural economics with future Nobel Prize winner, Theodore Schultz. Hardin became the school's Dean of Agriculture in 1953 and was the Chancellor of the University of Nebraska from 1954 to 1968.

On January 21, 1969, Hardin served as the U.S. secretary of agriculture by President Richard Nixon. As the secretary, Hardin extended the food stamp program and established both the Food and Nutrition Service (to administer the food programs for the poor) and the Office of Intergovernmental Affairs (to coordinate the efforts of state and local officials). Hardin resigned on November 17, 1971, and was replaced by Earl L. Butz.

Hardin died from kidney disease and congestive heart failure in Lincoln, Nebraska, on April 4, 2010, at the age of 94.

His daughter, Nancy H. Rogers, married Douglas L. Rogers, the son of Secretary of State William P. Rogers. His other daughter, Cynthia H. Milligan, was married to Robert Milligan.

Political offices
Preceded by Orville L. Freeman	U.S. Secretary of Agriculture; Served under: Richard Nixon; 1969–1971	Succeeded by Earl L. Butz
