= List of botanical gardens and arboretums in Nebraska =

This list of botanical gardens and arboretums in Indiana is intended to include all significant botanical gardens and arboretums in the U.S. state of Nebraska

Name	Image	Affiliation	City
Alice Abel Arboretum		Nebraska Wesleyan University	Lincoln
Arbor Lodge State Historical Park and Arboretum			Nebraska City
Doane College Osterhout Arboretum		Doane University	Crete
Governor Furnas Arboretum			Brownville
Gilman Park Arboretum			Pierce
Itha T. Krumme Memorial Arboretum			Falls City
Lauritzen Gardens			Omaha
Maxwell Arboretum		University of Nebraska–Lincoln	Lincoln
D. A. Murphy Panhandle Arboretum			Scottsbluff
Nebraska Statewide Arboretum		University of Nebraska–Lincoln	Lincoln
Norris Forest School Arboretum			Hickman
Northfield Park Arboretum			Gering
State Fair Park Arboretum			Lincoln
Joshua C. Turner Arboretum		Union College	Lincoln
Wayne State College Arboretum		Wayne State College	Wayne

== See also ==
- List of botanical gardens and arboretums in the United States
