= Tourism in Lincoln, Nebraska =

Lincoln, Nebraska is the home of the state capitol of Nebraska, the University of Nebraska–Lincoln and has history dating back to the mid-1800s. A list of tourist attractions that can be found within the city are as follows.

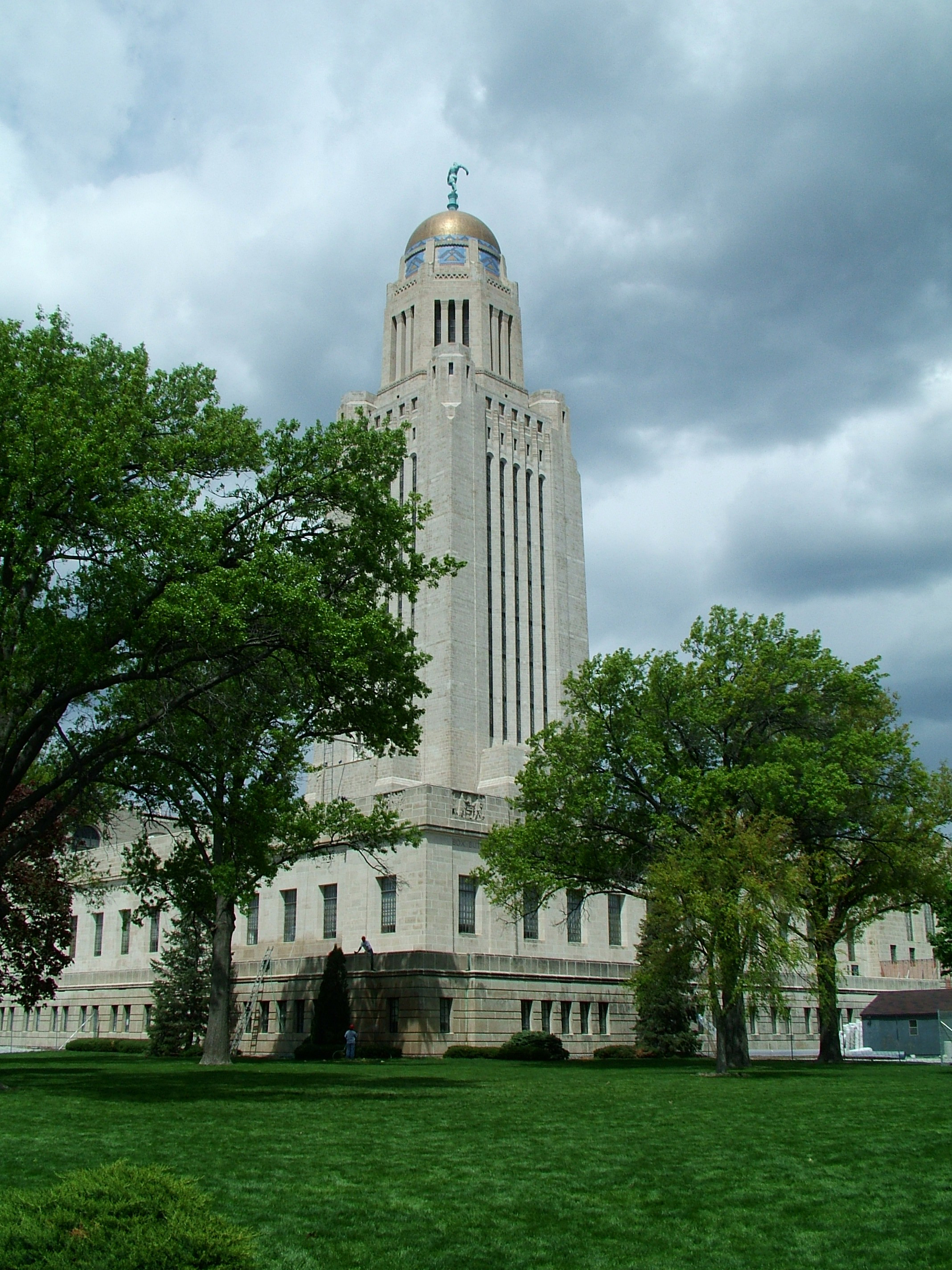
Nebraska State Capitol

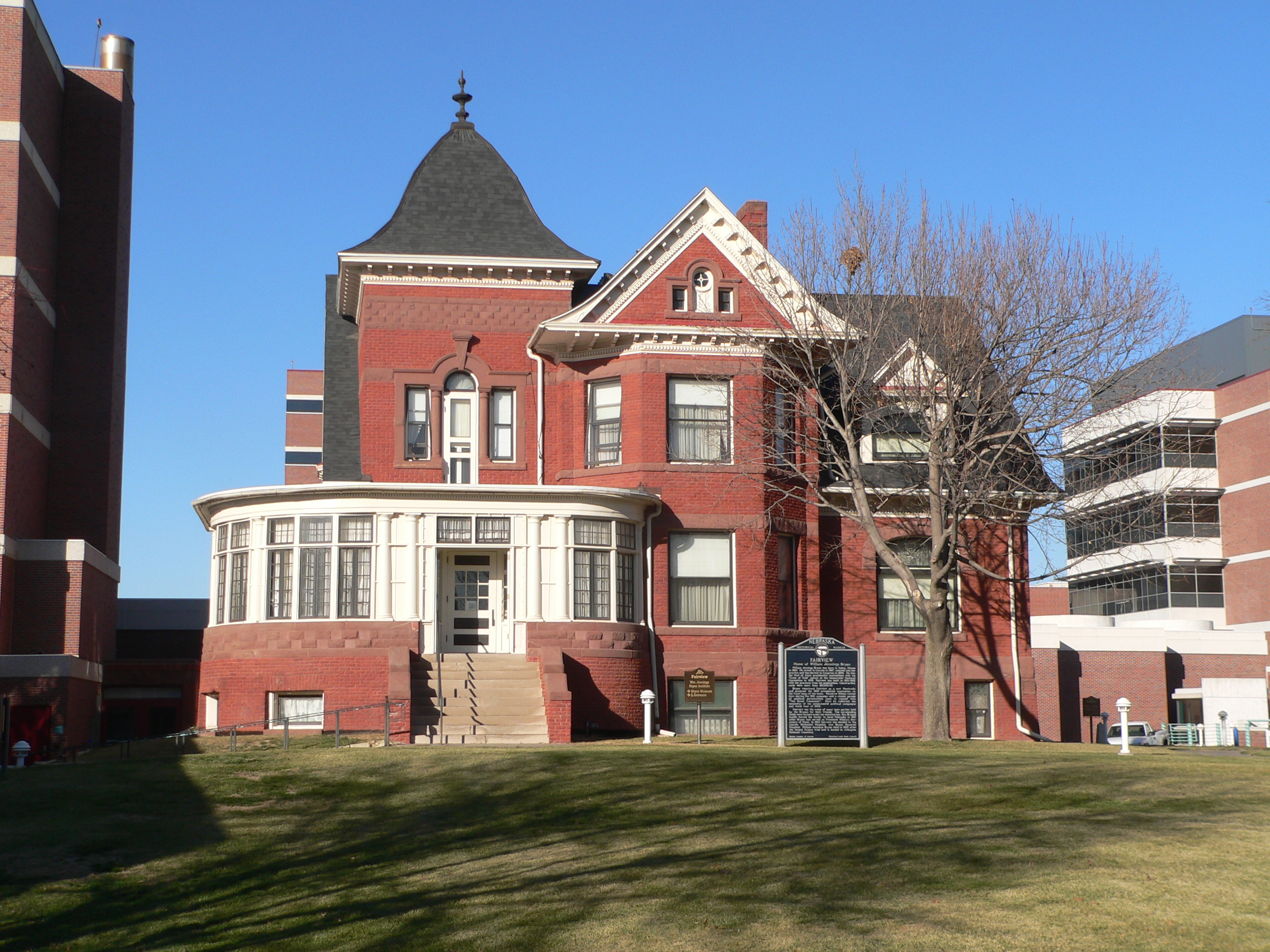
Fairview

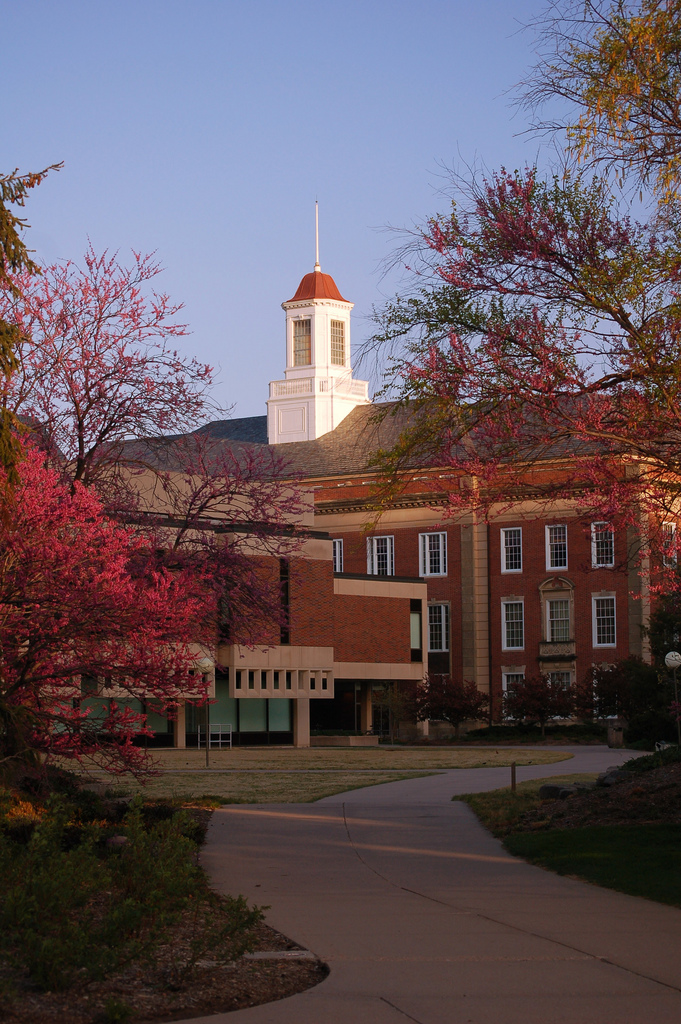
Love Library

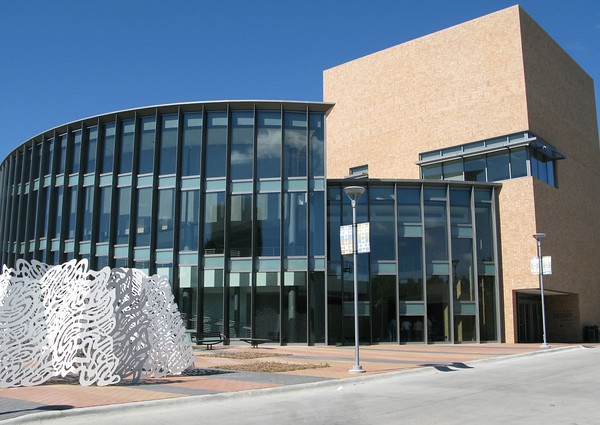
International Quilt Study Center & Museum

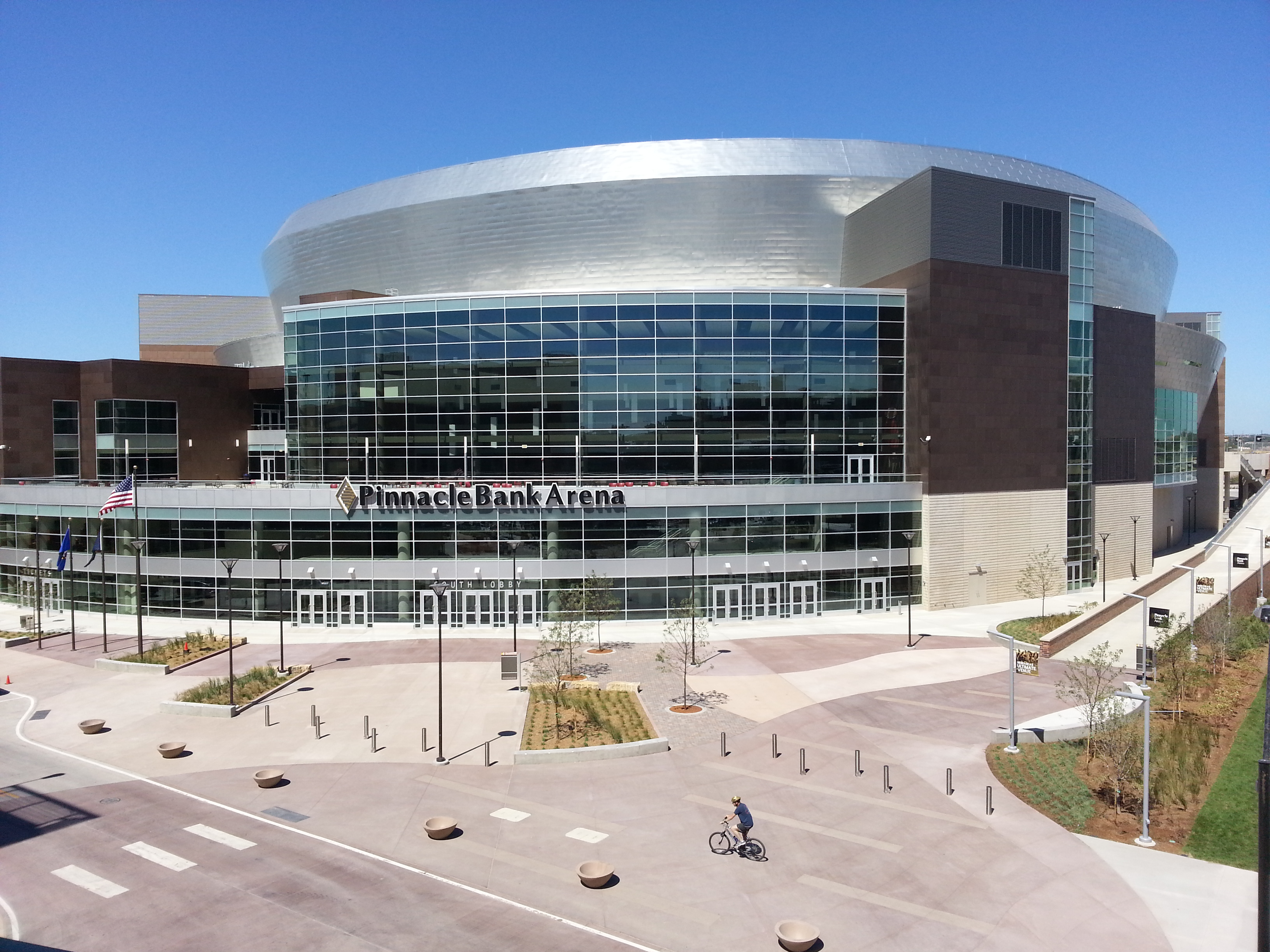
Pinnacle Bank Arena

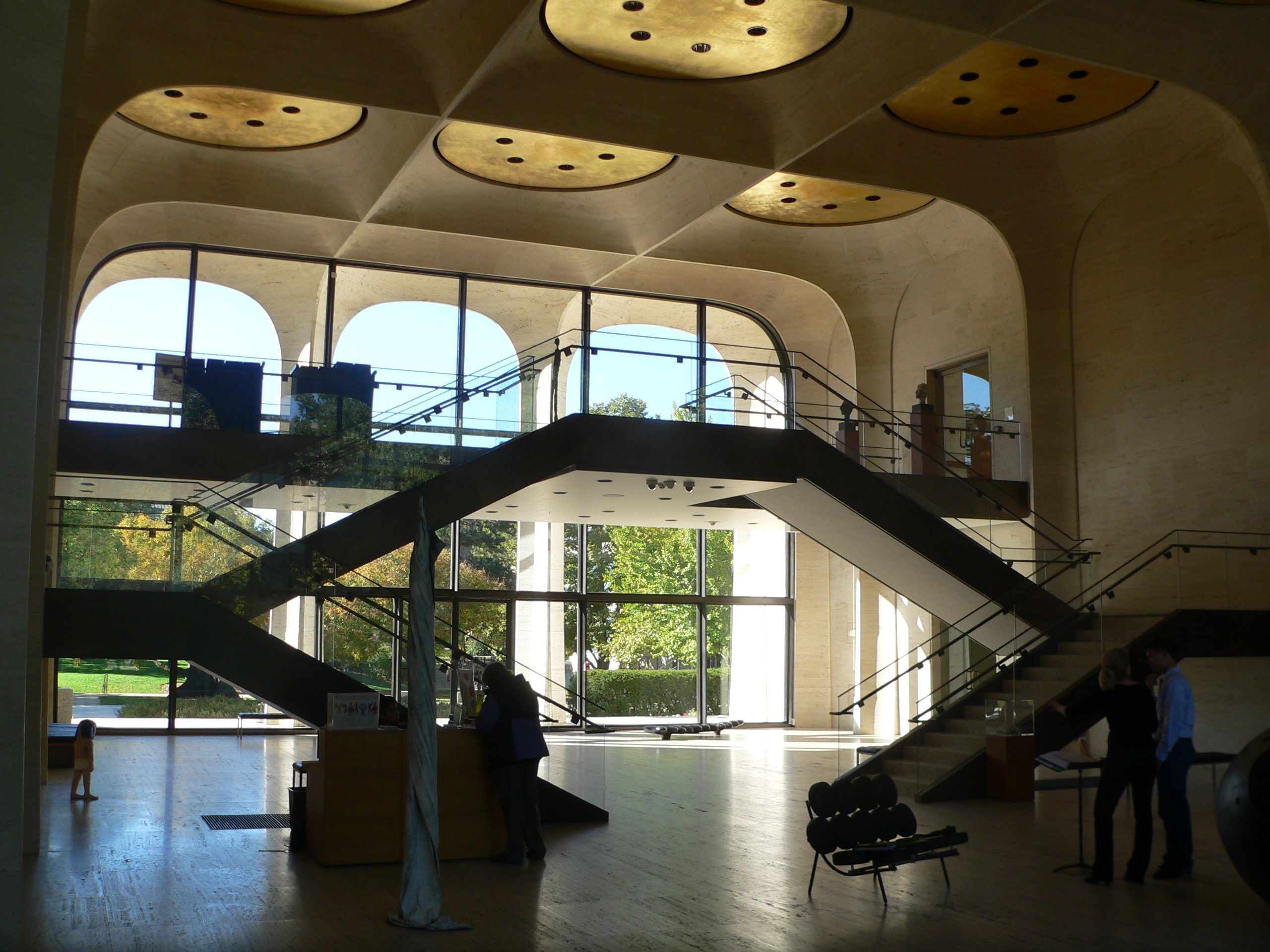
Sheldon Memorial Art Gallery

== Arboretums/gardens ==
- Alice Abel Arboretum
- Hamann Rose Garden
- Joshua C. Turner Arboretum
- Maxwell Arboretum
- Sunken Gardens

== Attractions ==
- Centennial Mall
- Downtown Lincoln
- Deer Springs Winery
- Governor's Mansion
- Historic Haymarket and West Haymarket
- Hyde Observatory
- James Arthur Vineyards
- Lincoln Children's Zoo
- Lux Center for the Arts
- Nebraska State Capitol
- P Street District

== Event venues/arenas ==
- John Breslow Ice Hockey Center
- Haymarket Park
- Ice Box
- Lancaster Event Center
- Lincoln Community Playhouse
- Pinewood Bowl Theater (in Pioneers Park)
- Pinnacle Bank Arena

== Historic sites ==
- Fairview, home of William Jennings Bryan
- Robber's Cave
- Thomas P. Kennard House
- Wyuka Cemetery

== Museums ==
- American Historical Society of Germans from Russia Museum
- Lincoln Children's Museum
- Midwestern African Museum of Art, Culture & Resource Center
- Museum of American Speed
- Museum of Nebraska History
- National Museum of Roller Skating (and the offices of USA Roller Sports)
- Nebraska High School Sports Hall of Fame

== University of Nebraska–Lincoln ==
- Bob Devaney Sports Center
- Eisentrager Howard Gallery
- Great Plains Art Museum
- International Quilt Study Center & Museum
- Kawasaki Reading Room
- Kimball Recital Hall
- The Kruger Collection in the College of Architecture
- Lentz Collection for Asian Culture
- Lester F. Larsen Tractor Test & Power Museum
- Lied Center for Performing Arts and Johnny Carson Theater
- Love Library
- Mary Riepma Ross Media Arts Center, a.k.a. The Ross
- Memorial Stadium: Home of the Cornhuskers football team, built in 1923
- The Robert Hillestad Textiles Gallery
- Sheldon Museum of Art: built in the early 1960s, architect Philip Johnson
- UNL Botanical Garden & Arboretum (City Campus)
- UNL Botanical Garden & Arboretum (East Campus)
- UNL Dairy Store
- University of Nebraska State Museum (Morrill Hall) and Mueller Planetarium, Nebraska's only fulldome digital planetarium
