= Nebraska Statewide Arboretum =

Official network of arboretums for the State of Nebraska

- Administrator: University of Nebraska–Lincoln
- Sites: 110
- Website: Official website

The Nebraska Statewide Arboretum (NSA) is a network of arboreta, botanical gardens, parks, and other public landscapes across Nebraska. The NSA, headquartered at the University of Nebraska–Lincoln, administers 110 sites across the state.

== History ==
The arboretum was founded in 1978 as a partnership with the University of Nebraska–Lincoln College of Agricultural Sciences and Natural Resources and is an affiliate of the Center for Plant Conservation. It is supported by the arboretum office at the University of Nebraska–Lincoln in Lincoln, Nebraska.

Along with the Nebraska Forest Service, the Nebraska State Arboretum works to reintroduce native plants to each region of the state. The NSA offers to reimburse fifty percent of the cost of projects designed to add native plants to a community.

In 2024, the NSA completed construction of the Native Plant Production Greenhouse, a greenhouse on NU's East Campus that more than doubled its available plant-growing space. Approximately thirty percent of the project was funded by the Nebraska Department of Economic Development, with the rest coming from fundraising efforts and a $10-million United States Forest Service grant to care for tree planting, removal, and maintenance across Nebraska.

== Sites ==
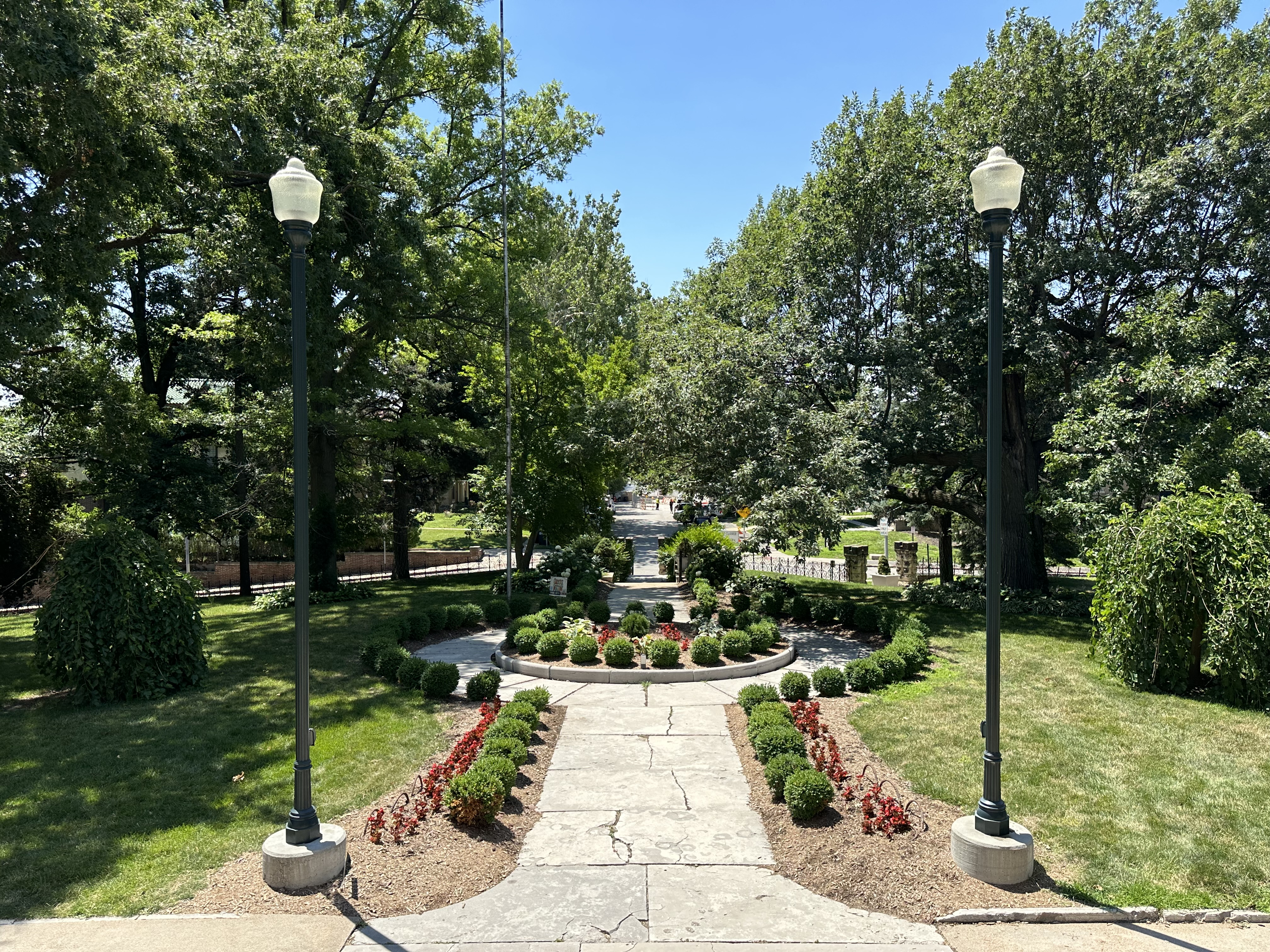
The grounds surrounding the Joslyn Castle are part of the Nebraska Statewide Arboretum

The Nebraska Statewide Arboretum administers 110 accredited sites across the state. Its larger collections include sites at Omaha's Metropolitan Community College at Fort Omaha, Joslyn Castle, Swanson Science Park, the Blair Community Arboretum (Steyer Park, Black Elk Park, and the Dana College campus), Gilman Park Arboretum in Pierce, the Joshua Turner Arboretum at Union Adventist University in Lincoln, and Clemmons Park Arboretum in Fremont.

=== Arboretums ===
- Aldersgate Gardens (Lincoln)
- Blair Arboretum (Blair)
- Campus of a Thousand Oaks Arboretum (Peru)
- Carol Joy Holling Camp (Ashland)
- Chautauqua Park Arboretum (Beatrice)
- Clemmons Park Arboretum (Fremont)
- D. A. Murphy Panhandle Arboretum (Scottsbluff)
- Downtown Lincoln Arboretum (Lincoln)
- Earl Maxwell Arboretum (Lincoln)
- Franklin-Cotterell Greens Arboretum (North Bend)
- Gilman Park Arboretum (Pierce)
- Glenn Viehmeyer Arboretum (North Platte)
- Governor Furnas Arboretum (Brownville)
- Jim Kluck Memorial Railside (Schuyler)
- Joslyn Castle (Omaha)
- Lauritzen Gardens (Omaha)
- Lincoln Regional Center Arboretum (Lincoln)
- Metropolitan Community College Arboretum (Omaha)
- Midland University Heritage Arboretum (Fremont)
- Missouri River Basin Lewis and Clark Center (Nebraska City)
- Nebraska College of Technical Agriculture (Curtis)
- Nebraska Wesleyan University Arboretum (Lincoln)
- Northfield Arboretum (Gering)
- Omaha Public Power District Arboretum (Omaha)
- Osterhout Arboretum (Crete)
- Pioneers Park Nature Center (Lincoln)
- Prairie Pines Arboretum (Lincoln)
- Prairie Song Arboretum (Lincoln)
- St. Roberts Arboretum (Omaha)
- University of Nebraska–Lincoln Botanical Gardens and Arboretum (Lincoln)
- Westview High School Arboretum (Omaha)

=== Landscape stewards ===
- Aagaard Farm Arboretum (Ord)
- Arbor Lodge State Historical Park and Arboretum (Nebraska City)
- Arrowhead Gardens Arboretum (Hebron)
- Bassett Memorial Park and Nature Trail (Bassett)
- Beatrice Public Library Arboretum (Beatrice)
- Bennington Heritage Arboretum (Bennington)
- Berried Treasures Arboretum (Thurston)
- CABG Patch (Omaha)
- Central Community College Arboretum (Hastings)
- Chadron State College Arboretum (Chadron)
- Chalco Hills Arboretum (Omaha)
- City of Kearney Cemetery Arboretum (Kearney)
- Concordia University Arboretum (Seward)
- Creighton University Arboretum (Omaha)
- Crete Public Schools Arboretum (Crete)
- Doug Nelson Youth Complex Arboretum (Bennington)
- Ehmen Park Arboretum (Gothenburg)
- Elmwood Park Arboretum (Omaha)
- Fairbury City Arboretum (Fairbury)
- Forest Lawn Memorial Park (Omaha)
- Foster Park (York)
- Gering Civic Plaza Arboretum (Gering)
- Gifford Park Arboretum (Omaha)
- Halleck Park Arboretum (Papillion)
- Hancock Home Farm (Tekamah)
- Harmon Park Landmark Site (Kearney)
- Hastings College Arboretum (Hastings)
- Hastings Highland Park Arboretum (Hastings)
- Hickman Linear Park Arboretum (Hickman)
- Historic Barnes Park Arboretum (Madison)
- Horning State Farm Arboretum (Plattsmouth)
- Itha Krumme Arboretum (Falls City)
- Joshua Turner Arboretum (Lincoln)
- Joslyn Art Museum Arboretum (Omaha)
- Lincoln Children's Zoo (Lincoln)
- Lincoln Water System Arboretum (Lincoln)
- Lower Elkhorn NRD Maskenthine Lake Arboretum (Stanton)
- Lower Loup Natural Resource District (Ord)
- Lower Platte South NRD (Lincoln)
- Malcolm Gardens (Malcolm)
- May Museum Arboretum (Fremont)
- Minden Community Arboretum (Minden)
- Nebraska State Capitol (Lincoln)
- Norman Walburn Memorial Arboretum (Cambridge)
- Northeast Arboretum (Concord)
- Northeast Community College Arboretum (Norfolk)
- Ogallala Community Arboretum (Ogallala)
- Penn Park (Neligh)
- Pheasant Point Arboretum (Alma)
- Prairie Loft Center for Outdoor Learning (Hastings)
- Prospect Hill Cemetery (Omaha)
- Ridge Cemetery Arboretum (Fremont)
- Riverside Park (Neligh)
- Sallows Conservatory and Arboretum (Alliance)
- Schramm Education Center (Gretna)
- Scribner City Park (Scribner)
- Skyview Arboretum (Norfolk)
- Southeast Nebraska Cancer Memorial garden (Humboldt)
- South Ridge Village Association (Lincoln)
- South Sioux City Arboretum (South Sioux City)
- Stella Arboretum (Stella)
- Stenberg Arboretum (Lexington)
- Suck's Lake and Park Arboretum (Grand Island)
- Taylor Community Arboretum (Taylor)
- Taylor Park Neighborhood Association (Lincoln)
- Three Oaks Arboretum (Omaha)
- Tri Trails Park (Ogallala)
- Unadilla Area Arboretum (Unadilla)
- University of Nebraska at Kearney Arboretum (Kearney)
- Village of Table Rock Arboretum (Table Rock)
- Vintage Heights Neighborhood Arboretum (Lincoln)
- Wayne State College Arboretum (Wayne)
- Wilber Community Arboretum (Wilber)
- Woods Park (Lincoln)

== Events ==
The Nebraska Statewide Arboretum promotes and sells native plants as part of a goal to create environmentally sustainable landscapes across the state. The Spring Affair, hosted annually at the Lancaster Event Center as the first plant sale of the season, is the largest event of its kind in the region. As a nonprofit organization that receives limited state funding, the NSA uses its plant sales as a significant revenue generator.

The NSA hosts "garden walks" at its Lincoln and Omaha sites to educate patrons about horticulture and conservation efforts.

== See also ==
- List of botanical gardens in the United States
- List of botanical gardens and arboretums in Nebraska
