= A Resurrection =

A Resurrection may refer to:

- A Resurrection (short story)
- A Resurrection (film)

== See also ==
- Resurrection (disambiguation)
