= Port of Omaha =

Location
- Country: United States
- Location: Omaha, Nebraska

Details
- Opened: 1888

The Port of Omaha was a port in the United States with facilities on the west side of the Missouri River in Omaha, Nebraska. The Port was formally sanctioned by the U.S. Congress in 1888.

== History ==
=== 1856–1949 ===
Founded immediately on the settlement of Omaha in 1856, the Port of Omaha was surveyed by Benjamin H. Barrows. Originally located at the foot of Davenport Street in Downtown Omaha, in recent years that site has been redeveloped as a boat launch and docking location called Miller's Landing. In addition to originally handling outbound barge shipments of grain and passenger boats, the Port also handled inbound shipments of steel and asphalt.

Starting in the 1930s the U.S. Army Corps of Engineers planned to channelize the Missouri River, and business leaders in Omaha immediately began clamoring for increased barge traffic to the city. In 1937 the Omaha Chamber of Commerce began lobbying the Nebraska State Legislature to create a dock authority that could take funds from the Public Works Administration to support the development of the Port property. The Union Pacific Railroad, based in Omaha, supported the move believing it would generate more business for its tracks. In 1938 John Latenser, Sr. drew up plans, which were subsequently submitted and denied by the PWA. Subsequent bids to the Reconstruction Finance Corporation and the Works Progress Administration failed as well, leaving the city without adequate docking facilities when barge traffic opened in 1940.

=== 1950–present ===
There was once a spur railroad line to the location, and in the 1950s there were plans to develop the site with modern storage buildings and a crane for unloading; however, those plans did not come to fruition.

As part of its Yucca Mountain nuclear waste repository plan, the U.S. Department of Energy proposed using the Port to receive up to 125 barge shipments carrying giant high-level radioactive waste containers up the Missouri River from the Cooper Nuclear Station, which is located at Brownville, Nebraska.

== See also ==
- History of Omaha
- Transportation in Omaha
