= Bernice Slote =

American Willa Cather scholar

- Born: November 17, 1913; Hickman, Nebraska U.S.
- Died: February 22, 1983 (aged 69); Lincoln, Nebraska, U.S.
- Occupations: Willa Cather scholar Professor

Bernice Slote (November 17, 1913 – February 22, 1983), a Willa Cather scholar, was a professor of English at the University of Nebraska–Lincoln.

== Early life and education ==
Slote was born in Hickman, Nebraska, the granddaughter of Nebraska homesteaders. She graduated from Nebraska Wesleyan University in 1933, and then taught English at Ord High School from 1934 until 1941.

In 1941 she earned her master's degree in English at the University of Nebraska, and continued graduate work at the University of Michigan where she earned two Hopwood Awards for writing poetry. Despite encouragement from her professors, she decided not to earn her Ph.D.; instead she taught English at the Nebraska City High School from 1941-1942. From 1942-1946 she was Instructor of English, Director of the Library, and the Assistant to the Dean at Norfolk Junior College.

== Career ==
Slote was well known as editor, poet, teacher, scholar, and critic. In 1946 she joined the faculty of the English Department at the University of Nebraska, where she taught literature and writing. Her poems had begun to appear in leading journals around the country: The Atlantic Monthly, Michigan Quarterly Review, Voices, Poetry Chap-Book, etc. In 1963 she became editor of the Prairie Schooner, a responsibility she retained until her retirement in 1980.

Her first book Keats and the Dramatic Principle (1958) won the Explicator Award for the best book of literary analysis in English or American Literature. Her second book Start with the Sun (1960) with James E. Miller Jr. and Karl Shapiro, won the Chap-Book Award from the Poetry Society of America for an outstanding work in the field of poetry criticism. Her three text-book anthologies, The Dimensions of Poetry (1962), The Dimensions of Short Story (1964), and The Dimensions of Literature, (1967), with James E. Miller Jr. were widely used and well received. She edited Myth and Symbol: Critical Approaches and Applications (1963), and Literature and Society: Nineteen Essays (1964), and wrote numerous articles on literary subjects.

She is best known for her work on Willa Cather. Her publications included editions of April Twilights (1903); Poems of Willa Cather (1962, 1968); The Kingdom of Art: Willa Cather's First Principles and Critical Statements, 1893-1896 (1967); and Uncle Valentine and Other Stories: Willa Cather's Uncollected Short Fiction (1973, 1986), all published by the University of Nebraska Press.

== Personal life ==
In addition to writing, editing, lecturing, teaching, advising graduate students, and supervising doctoral candidates, Slote also moderated a KUON-TV discussion panel (Conversation Piece). She was also active on the Board of Governors of the Willa Cather Memorial in Red Cloud, the Nebraska State Poet Laureate Commission, and the Western Literature Association. At the University of Nebraska Press, she served as an advisory editor. She died in Lincoln, Nebraska, on February 22, 1983.

== Works and publications ==
- Slote, Bernice; Keats, John (1958). Keats and the Dramatic Principle. Lincoln: University of Nebraska Press. OCLC 489923157.
- Slote, Bernice; Frye, Northrop (1988). Myth and Symbol: Critical Approaches and Applications. Lincoln: University of Nebraska Press. OCLC 19280791. "A selection of papers delivered at the joint meeting of the Midwest Modern Language Association and the Central Renaissance Conference, 1962."
- Cather, Willa; Slote, Bernice (1966). The Kingdom of Art: Willa Cather's First Principles and Critical Statements, 1893-1896. Lincoln: University of Nebraska Press. ISBN 978-0-8032-0012-8. OCLC 906054260.
