= Robber's Cave =

Robber's Cave may refer to:

== Caves ==
- Daneil's Cave, also called the Robber's Cave, in Saxony-Anhalt, Germany
- Robber's Cave, India, a river cave formation in Uttarakhand, India
- Robber's Cave in Lincoln, Nebraska, USA
- Robber's Cave in the Blaise Castle estate, Bristol, England

== Other uses ==
- Robbers Cave study, an experiment in realistic conflict theory
- Robbers Cave State Park, Latimer County, Oklahoma, USA
