= Wayne State College Arboretum =

Arboretum in Wayne, Nebraska, US

Coordinates: 42°14′28″N 97°00′54″W

- Interactive map of Wayne State College Arboretum
- Website: Official website

The Wayne State College Arboretum (127 acres) is located on and around the main campus of Wayne State College, 1111 Main Street, Wayne, Nebraska. It is an affiliate of the Nebraska Statewide Arboretum.

The Arboretum consists of the main campus, Nature Center, and Wildcat Fitness Trail. Both native and non-indigenous species have been planted, and are being evaluated for their suitability to the local conditions.

== See also ==
- List of botanical gardens in the United States
