= College of Agricultural Sciences and Natural Resources (University of Nebraska–Lincoln) =

- Type: Public
- Established: 1909; 117 years ago
- Parent institution: University of Nebraska–Lincoln
- Dean: Thomas Burkey (interim)
- Students: 3,222 (2020)
- Undergraduates: 2,471 (2020)
- Postgraduates: 751 (2020)
- Location: Lincoln, Nebraska
- Campus: Urban
- Website: casnr.unl.edu

The College of Agricultural Sciences and Natural Resources (CASNR) is the agriculture and natural resources college at the University of Nebraska–Lincoln in Lincoln, Nebraska. CASNR was established in 1909 and primarily uses facilities on the university's East Campus. Thomas Burkey has served as interim dean since February 2025.

== History and overview ==
The University of Nebraska established the School of Agriculture in 1877 as part of the Industrial College, three years after the university was founded. Agricultural buildings were built on the outskirts of town given the lack of available farmland in downtown Lincoln, an area that became known as Farm Campus. The school received a boost when the Second Morrill Act was passed by the United States Congress in 1890, providing annual funds for land-grant research universities to support agricultural departments. In 1909 it was separated from the Industrial College as the College of Agriculture.

CASNR became part of the university's Institute of Agriculture and Natural Resources (IANR) in 1973, along with the Agricultural Research Division and the Nebraska Extension, as well as equivalent departments in the College of Education and Human Sciences. The IANR functions as the research arm of NU's agricultural programs, focusing on "food production, environmental stewardship, human nutrition, business development, and youth engagement."

The department was renamed the College of Agriculture Sciences and Natural Resources in 1990. Farm Campus became East Campus and still houses most CASNR facilities, though it is no longer on the outskirts of Lincoln as the surrounding area was developed. The college offers one of sixteen PGA Golf Management degree programs in the United States and operates the Dairy Store, an ice cream parlor on East Campus.

== Research ==
Along with its affiliates in the IANR, CASNR operates eight research sites across the state, primarily focusing on animal science, including the Barta Brothers Ranch, a 6,000-acre farm in central Nebraska gifted by Clifford and James Barta to the University of Nebraska–Lincoln in 1996. The department also operates the Gudmundsen Sandhills Laboratory, a cattle breeding and ranch economics research center in the Sandhills.

In conjunction with the Nebraska Forest Service, students and faculty of CASNR operate the Horning State Farm Demonstration Forest, a 240-acre forest near Plattsmouth used for forestry cultivation and management training.

== Degree programs ==
CASNR administers twenty-five undergraduate degree programs: Agribusiness, Agricultural Economics, Agricultural Leadership, Education and Communication, Agricultural Systems Technology, Agronomy, Animal Science, Biochemistry, Data Science, Environmental Science, Environmental and Sustainability Studies, Fisheries & Wildlife, Food Science & Technology, Forensic Science, Grassland Systems, Insect Science, Integrated Science Online Degree Completion, Microbiology, Natural Resource & Environmental Economics, PGA Golf Management, Plant Biology, Plant and Landscape Systems, Regional and Community Forestry, Statistics and Data Analytics, Veterinary Science, and Veterinary Technology, as well as fifteen master's and twelve PhD degree programs.
