= Governor Furnas Arboretum =

Arboretum in Brownville, Nebraska

Coordinates: 40°23′49″N 95°39′42″W

- Interactive map of Governor Furnas Arboretum

The Governor Furnas Arboretum is a young arboretum located in Brownville, Nebraska, United States.

The arboretum was planted in 1992–93, and became an affiliate of the Nebraska Statewide Arboretum in 1996. It now contains over 100 species, including European beech, sweetgum, blackgum, willow oak, fringe tree, Balkan pine, and Japanese kerria.

The arboretum honors former Governor Robert W. Furnas, a Brownville native who became Nebraska's second governor in 1872. Together with Julius Sterling Morton, he promoted the planting of trees across Nebraska, and in 1874 signed a proclamation declaring the first Arbor Day.

== See also ==
- List of botanical gardens in the United States
