= D. A. Murphy Panhandle Arboretum =

Arboretum in Scottsbluff, Nebraska, United States

Coordinates: 41°53′35″N 103°40′49″W

- Interactive map of D. A. Murphy Panhandle Arboretum

The D. A. Murphy Panhandle Arboretum (40 acres) is an arboretum located at the University of Nebraska–Lincoln Panhandle Research and Extension Center, 4502 Avenue I, Scottsbluff, Nebraska.

The Arboretum was established in 1984 as the University of Nebraska Panhandle Arboretum, and in 1985 recognized as a Nebraska Statewide Arboretum affiliate. In 1987 the Arboretum was awarded a generous endowment from local businessman D. A. Murphy's estate and renamed in his honor.

The Arboretum is a teaching and demonstration site, and features the David Nuland Ground Cover Collection, the Trails West Iris Collection, the Diana Harms cottonwood Collection, the Panhandle Prairie Transition site, and various tree and woody plant groves.

== See also ==
- List of botanical gardens in the United States
