= Cooper Nuclear Station =

Nuclear power plant near Brownville, Nebraska

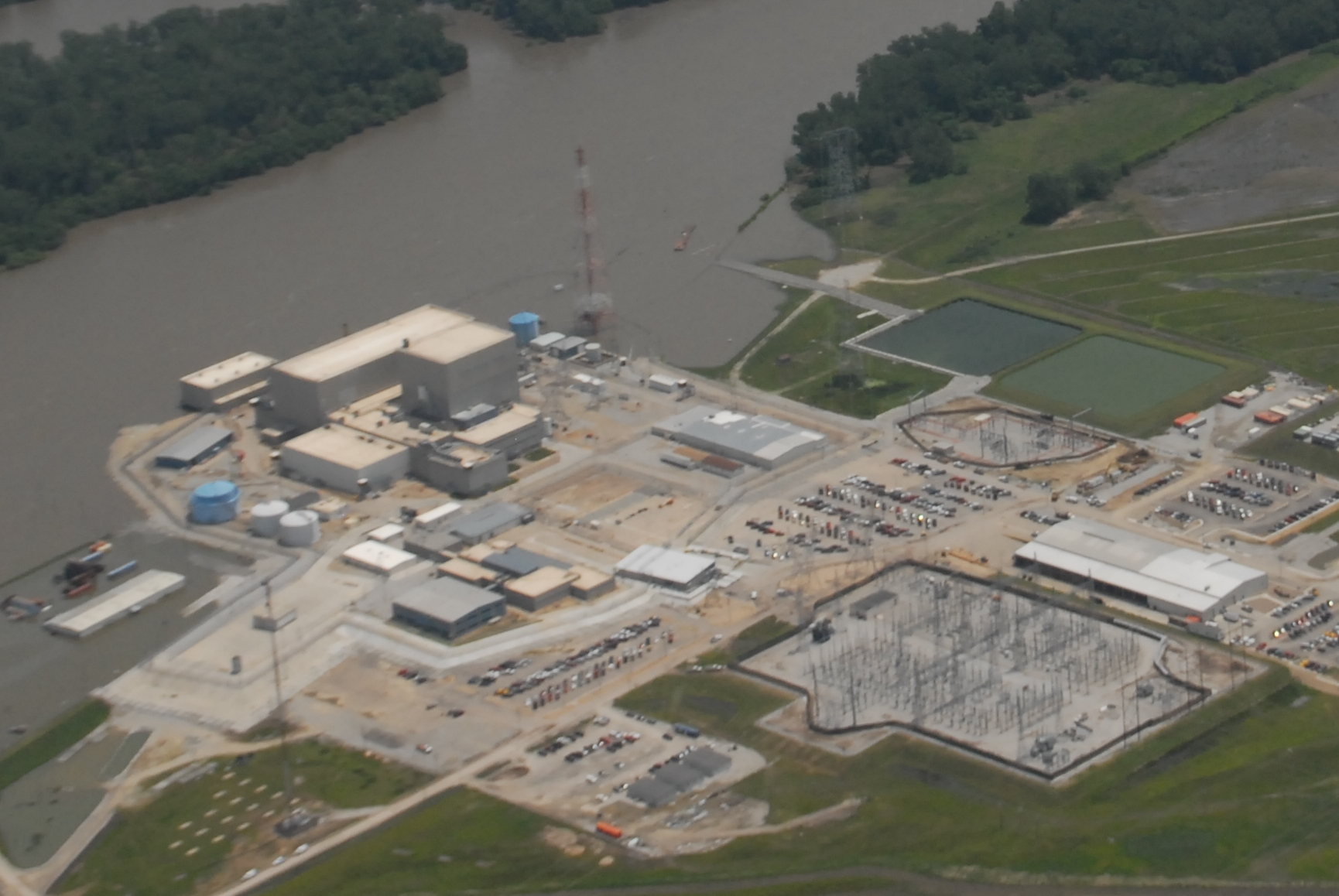
- The reactor complex on June 20, 2011 during the 2011 Missouri River Floods
- Country: United States
- Location: Nemaha County, near Brownville, Nebraska
- Coordinates: 40°21′43″N 95°38′29″W
- Status: Operational
- Construction began: June 1, 1968
- Commission date: July 1, 1974
- Construction cost: $1.152 billion (2007 USD)
- Owner: Nebraska Public Power District
- Operator: Nebraska Public Power District

Nuclear power station
- Reactor type: BWR
- Reactor supplier: General Electric
- Cooling source: Missouri River
- Thermal capacity: 1 × 2419 MW_{th}

Power generation
- Units operational: 1 × 769 MW
- Make and model: BWR-4 (Mark 1)
- Nameplate capacity: 835 MW
- Capacity factor: 94% (2021); 75.30% (lifetime)
- Annual net output: 6880 GWh (2021)

External links
- Website: Cooper Nuclear Station
- Commons: Related media on Commons

Cooper Nuclear Station (CNS) is a boiling water reactor (BWR) type nuclear power plant located on a 1,251-acre (506 ha) site near Brownville, Nebraska between Missouri River mile markers 532.9 and 532.5, on Nebraska's border with Missouri. It is the largest single-unit electrical generator in Nebraska.

== Description ==
CNS is owned and operated by the Nebraska Public Power District (NPPD), a political subdivision of the state of Nebraska.

The facility is named after Humboldt natives Guy Cooper Jr., and Guy Cooper Sr. The senior Cooper's father, O. A. Cooper, built the first electrical plant in Humboldt in 1890; the two Guy Coopers served a total of 27 years on the board of NPPD and its predecessor agency, Consumers Public Power District.

CNS was first put into operation in July 1974 and generates approximately 800 megawatts (MWe) of electricity. The plant consists of a General Electric BWR/4 series reactor plant and a Westinghouse turbine generator. The plant has a Mark I containment system.

In 1998, CNS was the first plant in the United States to load nuclear fuel containing uranium that had been provided under the Megatons to Megawatts Program, in which uranium removed from nuclear weapons of the former Soviet Union was turned into low-enriched uranium and then into fuel.

In September 2008, NPPD applied to the U.S. Nuclear Regulatory Commission (NRC) for a renewal of the operating license for CNS, extending it for an additional twenty years. In November 2010 CNS received its license renewal, the 60th such renewal issued by the NRC.

In late 2003 NPPD signed a contract with Entergy Nuclear for management support services. An agreement was approved in January 2010 by NPPD to extend Entergy's management support services until January 2029. The original contract between the companies, signed in 2003, was for the remaining years of the plant's original operating license, which ran until January 18, 2014. In March 2022 NPPD announced that the Entergy contract would be terminated.

== Electricity production ==
Generation (MWh) of Cooper Nuclear Station
Year	Jan	Feb	Mar	Apr	May	Jun	Jul	Aug	Sep	Oct	Nov	Dec	Annual (Total)
2001	570,854	511,780	276,090	550,990	566,188	512,170	552,287	542,855	532,491	557,507	33,329	0	5,206,541
2002	495,158	519,785	564,856	548,906	374,079	534,267	547,998	556,080	538,948	566,632	509,234	561,208	6,317,151
2003	570,858	371,269	0	100,096	473,604	0	515,736	549,216	467,125	483,390	478,233	482,806	4,492,333
2004	570,190	518,699	568,879	542,943	541,962	537,929	551,689	554,465	536,463	325,798	399,430	523,326	6,171,773
2005	212,974	168,277	586,909	504,109	581,006	539,729	560,062	560,750	462,607	578,778	565,803	570,917	5,891,921
2006	585,258	458,742	557,176	558,161	503,285	546,692	560,098	559,952	529,890	351,432	112,345	587,445	5,910,476
2007	551,175	528,415	581,860	560,976	497,995	553,996	562,389	556,546	556,189	581,260	556,135	584,312	6,671,248
2008	581,610	536,581	520,326	171,925	218,031	552,091	565,277	504,174	565,840	590,080	569,225	588,920	5,964,080
2009	587,498	504,938	435,330	568,654	583,854	561,883	576,686	572,285	435,733	0	317,583	590,135	5,734,579
2010	564,779	524,026	577,947	561,764	578,078	522,580	574,869	571,820	566,039	589,289	570,669	591,023	6,792,883
2011	588,152	528,133	222,112	0	404,967	564,552	569,259	570,471	564,037	591,506	571,226	593,689	5,768,104
2012	577,696	544,833	579,827	564,716	580,394	538,895	562,325	539,821	551,599	221,146	11,227	544,797	5,817,276
2013	585,509	526,150	586,081	568,988	583,935	534,493	540,960	572,432	553,501	589,858	570,476	591,639	6,804,022
2014	589,912	531,095	533,966	560,710	542,331	453,919	576,061	568,559	455,723	0	512,176	592,883	5,917,335
2015	587,113	533,977	589,883	564,689	532,358	538,878	574,358	574,340	563,194	590,591	567,743	583,647	6,800,771
2016	589,449	541,857	586,184	564,671	581,592	551,925	566,791	558,693	386,444	0	396,322	601,428	5,925,356
2017	600,284	535,812	594,643	572,954	548,837	566,137	575,530	581,200	569,647	598,546	567,434	601,713	6,912,737
2018	600,802	520,240	470,665	575,176	543,813	459,047	574,976	574,741	484,688	0	230,947	597,045	5,632,140
2019	599,741	535,889	594,028	571,805	588,606	562,395	577,309	578,535	568,007	599,121	576,456	599,708	6,951,600
2020	599,017	555,268	589,733	576,023	588,370	562,035	569,903	556,024	415,826	73,061	520,871	582,420	6,188,551
2021	593,104	537,796	593,538	572,048	581,317	557,635	572,827	571,013	564,009	590,923	549,176	597,236	6,880,622
2022	595,610	528,070	587,760	565,386	578,905	551,877	540,847	474,456	405,669	8,556	274,432	506,936	5,618,504
2023	600,694	534,363	593,680	573,446	576,057	561,847	577,255	573,143	567,103	592,743	575,390	600,332	7,426,053
2024	591,939	560,825	593,832	575,350	587,673	564,805	573,171	501,198	462,864	0	484,985	599,089	6,095,731
2025	600,357	532,293	591,479	573,339	584,881	564,947	570,163	570,672	565,303	591,934	576,383	600,228	6,921,979
2026	599,308	537,601	594,776	570,345	572,810	526,160	559,952	540,782					--

== Surrounding population ==
The Nuclear Regulatory Commission defines two emergency planning zones around nuclear power plants: a plume exposure pathway zone with a radius of 10 miles (16 km), concerned primarily with exposure to, and inhalation of, airborne radioactive contamination, and an ingestion pathway zone of about 50 miles (80 km), concerned primarily with ingestion of food and liquid contaminated by radioactivity. In 2010, the population within 10 miles of Cooper was 4,414; the population within 50 miles was 163,610. Cities within the 50-mile radius include Nebraska City, with a population of 7,289, located 25 miles (40 km) from the plant.

== Seismic risk ==
The Nuclear Regulatory Commission's estimate of the risk each year of an earthquake intense enough to cause core damage to the reactor at CNS was 1 in 142,857, according to an NRC study published in August 2010.

== Events ==
At 0402 CDT on June 19, 2011 a Notification of Unusual Event (the lowest of NRC emergency classifications) was declared due to the elevation of the Missouri River reaching 899.1 feet above mean sea level. This is above the Emergency Action Level HU1.5 elevation of 899 feet. Later, the Missouri River reached 900.6 feet on 6/23/2011 while elevation of 902 feet is the alert level for the plant. The plant left the emergency status at 9:47 a.m., July 12 after the river dropped to 895.8 feet—3 feet below the emergency status level. The nearby Fort Calhoun Nuclear Generating Station also faced flooding during this period.

On March 15, 2019, another Unusual Event low-level emergency was declared at Cooper due to flooding, with a forecast crest that exceeds the 2011 flooding.

== See also ==
- Port of Omaha
