= Doane University Osterhout Arboretum =

Arboretum at Doane University in Crete, Nebraska, United States

Coordinates: 40°37′17″N 96°56′58″W

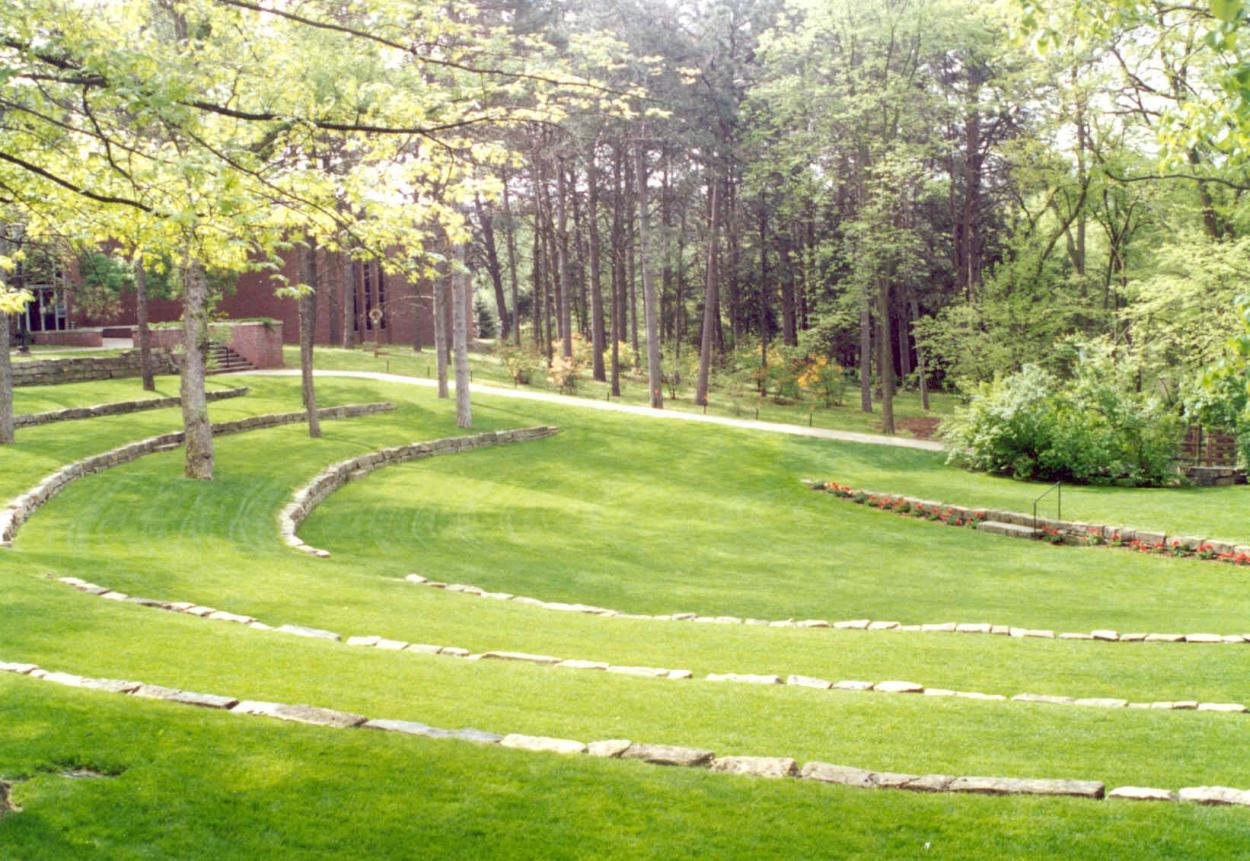
- Interactive map of Doane University Osterhout Arboretum

The Doane University Osterhout Arboretum is an arboretum at Doane University, Crete, Nebraska, named in honor of M. David Osterhout.

The Doane University Arboretum was officially rededicated as Osterhout Arboretum on May 9, 2002. The arboretum honors M. David Osterhout, a 1937 Doane graduate and a longtime college employee who served the college in many capacities, including acting president, treasurer, and senior vice president. Osterhout was also a leader in campus landscaping and plant preservation throughout his tenure at the college.

The 300-acre (1.2 km^{2}) Osterhout Arboretum includes special gardens; several distinctive, historical tree groves; lakes; an outdoor amphitheater; fountains; and wooded nature trails. Doane University has been a partner in the Nebraska Statewide Arboretum since 1979. This network of horticulture sites was established to promote knowledge, appreciation, and conservation of trees and other plants throughout the state.
