= Adam Mania =

Polish swimmer

Personal information
- Nickname: DB Snitcha
- National team: United States / Poland
- Born: August 31, 1983 (age 42) Hickman, Nebraska, U.S.
- Height: 1.88 m (6 ft 2 in)
- Weight: 86.2 kg (190 lb)

Sport
- Sport: Swimming
- Strokes: Backstroke and breaststroke
- Club: Schroeder YMCA Swim Team
- College team: University of Wisconsin–Madison

Adam Mania (born August 31, 1983 in Hickman, Nebraska) is a swimmer who competed in the 2004 Summer Olympics in Athens, Greece for Poland. In 2006, he switched allegiance to the United States. He grew up in Hickman, Nebraska, where he attended Norris School District 160 and swam for Beatrice High School.

He was initially trained at Country Kids Swim Team in Bennett, Nebraska in a 2-lane 20-yard pool by Robin Lowe until college.

He swam for the University of Wisconsin–Madison, where he was a Big-10 champion in the 400 freestyle relay, and a 13-time All-American. He was the University of Wisconsin–Madison school record holder in the 100 backstroke, 200 backstroke, 200 breaststroke, and 200 individual medley. He was the U.S. National Champion in 2006 in the 100 backstroke and 200 individual medley in the meet held in Federal Way, Washington. In 2010 Mania was also part of his team's national championship 4 x 100 LCM Freestyle Relay, giving him his third U.S. national title.

He was a coach and swimmer for Schroeder YMCA Swim Team in Brown Deer, Wisconsin and coached by Dave Anderson when he won his 3 National Titles and also when he set the US Open Record in the 50m Backstroke. His main training partner for the 2012 Olympic trials was Kevin Ewald.

His parents are Genowefa Szczerbowska and Zbigniew Mania who met in a refugee camp in Vienna, Austria in 1981 after fleeing from Poland shortly before martial law was declared.
