= Nebraska Forest Service =

U.S. state forestry agency

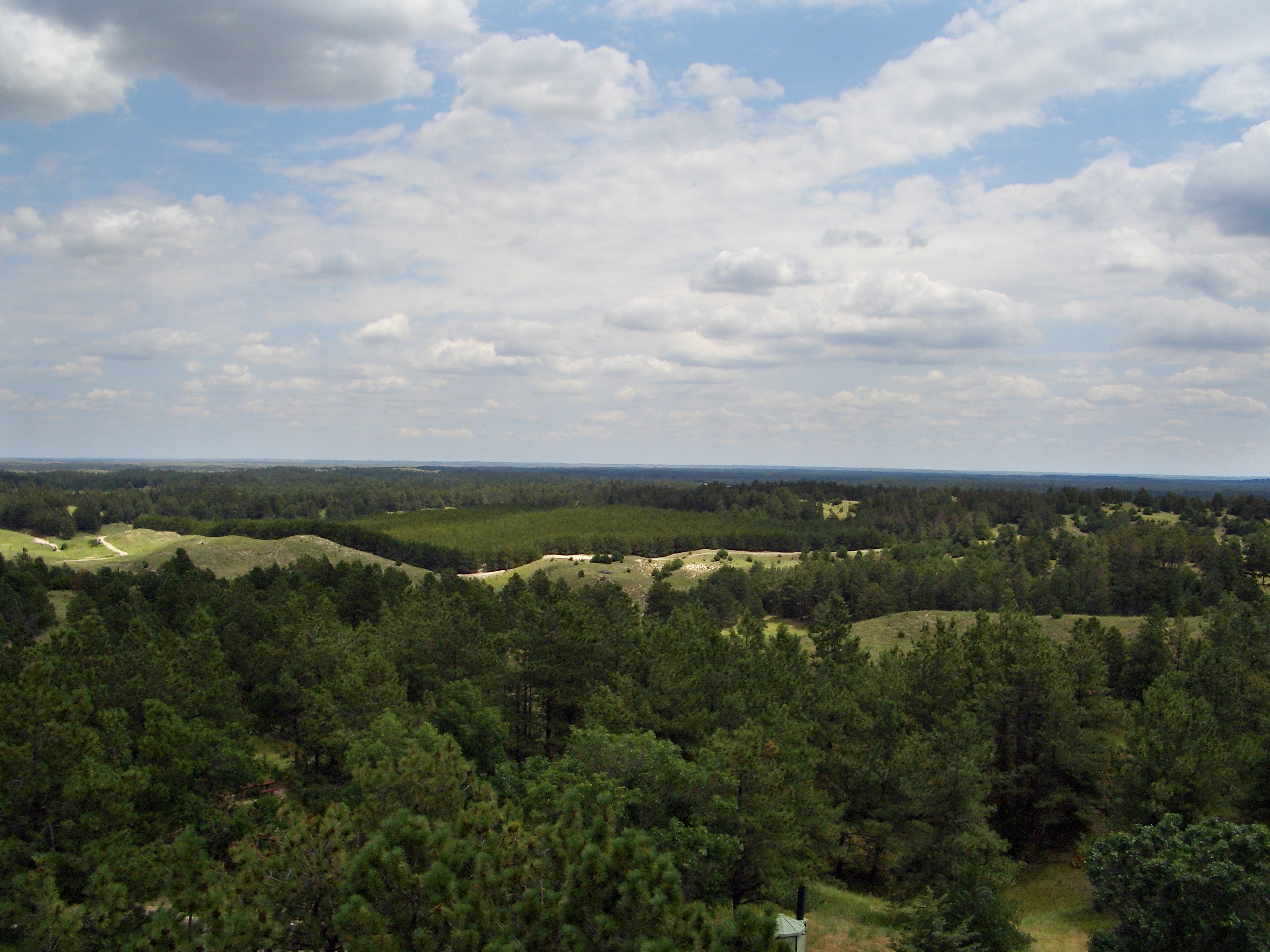
View from the Bessey Ranger District Office of the Nebraska National Forest near Halsey

The Nebraska Forest Service is the state forestry agency for the state of Nebraska. It provides services and education to the people of Nebraska and strives to protect and enhance the state's trees, forests, and other natural resources. The Nebraska Forest Service is headquartered at the University of Nebraska–Lincoln and is embedded within the school's Institution of Agriculture and Natural Resources.

== District offices ==
- Chadron: Northwest District
- Clay Center: South Central District
- Lincoln: Southeast District and headquarters
- Norfolk: Northeast District
- North Platte: Southwest District
- Ord: North Central District

== Programs ==
=== Rural Forestry ===
The Rural Forestry program provides technical assistance for forest management, tree planting, insect and disease problems, timber harvest, and fuel reduction. It seeks to assist landowners in developing management plans, cost-share assistance, education and training, and providing access to product markets.

=== Community Forestry and Sustainable Landscapes ===
The Community Forestry and Sustainable Landscapes program assists Nebraska's community forestry efforts by providing cost-share assistance, installation and management, network development for statewide arboretums and Tree City USA communities, training and professional development, disaster assistance, pest identification, monitoring and control recommendations, and development and support for statewide initiatives. It also administers programs for the Nebraska Statewide Arboretum.

=== Forest Health ===
The Forest Health program provides training in pest diagnosis, management, and research. Of particular interest to forest pests and disease study in Nebraska are the emerald ash borer, thousand cankers disease of Juglans nigra, pine wilt, the Asian long-horned beetle, and the mountain pine beetle.

=== Wildland Fire Protection ===
Wildland fire is an annual threat to Nebraska's forest resources, a diverse community which includes the Pine Ridge of the Nebraska panhandle consisting of ponderosa pines with tallgrass prairie understory, the redcedar-infested riparian eastern cottonwood forests of the Platte River corridor in the center of the state, and the Niobrara River valley in the northeast.

The Wildland Fire Protection's services include prevention and suppression training to rural districts, programming and material development, organization of citizen-based prevention groups, development of mutual aid directories, securing and reconditioning military vehicles for rural fire departments, providing cost-share assistance to purchase equipment and increase firefighter safety, and reducing overall risk through forest fuels management.

==== Forest Fuels Reduction ====
Thinning forests to lower fuels loads is the only effective way to reduce extreme wildfire behavior. The Forest Fuels Reduction Program creates strategic corridors of thinned forests to reduce fire intensity, improve suppression effectiveness, increase firefighter safety, and better protect lives and property.

=== Marketing and Utilization ===
==== Hybrid Hazelnut Commercialization ====
The Hybrid Hazelnut Commercialization project seeks to increase commercial development of the hybrid hazelnut as a profitable, environmentally friendly food and bioenergy crop. Commercially available hazelnuts, or filberts, have been produced only in Oregon from the European hazelnut due to disease susceptibility and lack of cold hardiness. After nearly a century of breeding, cold-hardy, disease-resistant hybrids that produce commercial quantities of high-quality nuts in Nebraska are now available. A consortium of the Nebraska Forest Service, Oregon State University, Rutgers University, and the Arbor Day Foundation is leading a national effort to commercialize this new "third" crop.

==== Woody biomass usage ====
Woody biomass is a carbon-neutral, clean-burning, renewable energy resource that is plentiful throughout Nebraska. The focus of woody biomass utilization in the state is to reduce Nebraska's energy dependence on fossil fuels, create jobs and new sources of income in rural areas, reduce forest fuel loads and risk of wildfires, create markets for eastern redcedar cleared from grazing lands, address scarce water issues in drought-stressed watersheds, and create more productive, healthier forests.
