= Norris Forest School Arboretum =

Arboretum in Nebraska, United States

Coordinates: 40°33′51″N 96°38′00″W

- Interactive map of Norris Forest School Arboretum

The Norris Forest School Arboretum is an 160-acre (65 ha; 650,000 m^{2}) arboretum located four miles (6 km) south of Hickman, Nebraska, and extends all around the grade school, middle school and high school buildings of the Norris School District.

The Arboretum contains a collection of approximately 400 trees and shrubs representing over 90 species, as well as a display of native grasses and plants, annual and perennial flowers, and a learning center (gazebo).

== See also ==
- List of botanical gardens in the United States
