= Dairy Store =

Ice cream parlor at the University of Nebraska–Lincoln

Coordinates: 40°49′45.4″N 96°40′1.8″W

University of Nebraska–Lincoln Dairy Store
- Interactive map of University of Nebraska–Lincoln Dairy Store

Restaurant information
- Established: 1917; 109 years ago
- Owner: University of Nebraska–Lincoln
- Food type: Ice cream
- Location: 114 Food Industry Complex, Lincoln, Nebraska
- Website: dairystore.unl.edu

The University of Nebraska–Lincoln Dairy Store is an ice cream parlor on the East Campus of the University of Nebraska–Lincoln in Lincoln, Nebraska. It was established in 1917 and is operated by students in the university's food science program within the College of Agricultural Sciences and Natural Resources. The store is considered a university staple and rotates through seasonal ice cream flavors in addition to cheese and meat offerings.

== History ==
The University of Nebraska Dairy Store was established in 1917 as Varsity Milk, selling all-you-can-drink milk to students on the condition they brought their own cup. The shop discontinued its milk sales and began serving ice cream shortly after opening, rebranding as the Dairy Store. It was based out of NU's Farm Campus (now East Campus) and originally sourced dairy from cows raised near the shop (the store now uses cows kept in Firth, approximately twenty miles south of Lincoln). In its early years, the Dairy Store regularly hosted student activities and selected a "dairy princess" until 1966.

The Dairy Store was located in the Dairy Industry Building until 1972, when it moved to the Food Industry Complex. In 2020, the shop moved to a larger space in the building designed to provide easier access from the adjacent Legacy Plaza, a greenspace connecting much of southern East Campus. Ice cream and cheese production were moved to the Food Innovation Center several miles away on Nebraska Innovation Campus; the vacated space at the Dairy Store was used to create educational exhibits.

=== Expansion ===
The Dairy Store has undertaken various efforts to establish a presence outside of the original shop, including sales at Memorial Stadium, but each proved unprofitable and was abandoned. A standalone location was opened in the Nebraska Student Union on City Campus in 2008, but closed just three years later, losing over $25,000 in its final year. College of Agricultural Sciences and Natural Resources dean Steve Waller noted a sharp dip in sales when students left campus during summer, the original Dairy Store's most profitable time of year, making it difficult for the City Campus location to stay afloat. The Dairy Store still sells prepackaged ice cream across campus and downtown Lincoln.

== Offerings ==
The Dairy Store permanently features its "Big Ten" flavors: 4H Clover Mint, Butter Brickle, Coffee Crunch, Caramel Cashew, Chocolate, Cookies and Cream, Husker Ice, Scarlet and Cream, Sweet Success, and Vanilla, as well as rotating seasonal options. The plant and store typically combine to employ twelve to fifteen students, who are encouraged to research and test their own flavors, which are sometimes added to the rotation. Flavor names are often dedicated to university landmarks, coaches, or administrators.

In addition to ice cream, the shop sells charcuterie boxes, coffee, and meats sourced from NU's animal science department. The University of Nebraska began developing "Husker cheeses" as part of its dairy husbandry department on Farm Campus in 1942.
