= April Twilights =

1903 poetry collection by Willa Cather

- First edition cover
- Author: Willa Cather
- Language: English
- Genre: Poetry
- Publisher: The Gorham Press
- Publication date: 1903
- Publication place: United States

April Twilights is a 1903 collection of poems by Willa Cather. It was reedited by Cather in 1923 and 1933. The poems were first published in many literary reviews, often under pen names.

== Literary significance and criticism ==
Cather's influences for the poems were, among others, Anthony Hope's The Prisoner of Zenda, Dante Gabriel Rossetti, Algernon Charles Swinburne, Oscar Wilde, Richard Wagner, Virgil's Georgics, William Shakespeare, François Villon, Pierre-Jean de Béranger, John Keats's Endymion and Hyperion, Alphonse Daudet's Kings in Exile, Heinrich Heine's The Gods in Exile and The North Sea, and Edward Coley Burne-Jones.

Cather's favourite poems were Grandmither, Mills of Montmartre and The Hawthorn Tree.

At the time of publication, the collection received mixed reviews; the Pittsburgh Gazette, the New York Times Saturday Review, Academy and Literature, the Criterion, the Bookman, the Chicago Tribune, and the Poet Lore praised it; The Dial thought it was bland. Cather decided to buy the remaining copies and burn them.

Mark Twain praised her poem The Palatine.

It has been noted that Cather broaches 'the enduring aura of a homosexual myth' as she alludes to Antinous several times in her poems.
