= A Resurrection (short story) =

1897 short story by Willa Cather

- Short story by Willa Cather
- Country: United States
- Language: English
- Genre: Short story

Publication
- Published in: Home Monthly
- Publication type: Women's magazine
- Publication date: April 1897

"A Resurrection" is a short story by American writer Willa Cather. It was first published in Home Monthly in April 1897.

== Plot summary ==
Martin is back to his hometown, Brownville, Nebraska, where he wants to pick up his son Bobbie and move to Kansas City with him. Upon hearing that, Marjorie is upset - she doesn't want to part with the child. Martin then sits by the bank of the Missouri River and reflects on his life - how he was one of the "river rats" in this town, he then worked on boats on that same river; he subsequently married Aimee de Mar in St. Louis, Missouri and they had a child together. She would overspend and get bored with domesticity; she eventually died as she was trying to run away. He then brought the baby back to Brownville, and Miss Marjorie has been looking after him since then.

Later, Marjorie sends Bobbie off to bed, and Martin comes along. He tells her he wants her to go to Kansas City with Bobbie and her. She expresses her dismay with the unkind letter he sent her when he married Aimee. Bobbie is awakened by the sound of the river, and Martin, in his faith in the water deity, hopes she will consent to his proposal.

== Characters ==
- Miss Marjorie Pierson, a.k.a. Margie.
- Mrs Skimmons
- Martin Dempster
- Bobbie
- Aimee de Mar
- Mrs Pierson, Marjorie's mother, crippled with rheumatism.

== Allusions to other works ==
- Literature is mentioned with Honoré de Balzac's comedie humaine, Sappho, Alfred de Musset, and Theocritus.
- Painting is mentioned with Guido Reni's Penitent Magdalene.
- The Brownville Village Theatre adapted a stage production in Brownville, Nebraska fall of 2017 brownvillevillagetheatre.com

== Allusions to actual history ==
- Thomas Tipton, one of the first two United States senators from Nebraska, is mentioned in the history of Brownville; he had a house there.
- Brownville is compared to Pompeii.

== Literary significance and criticism ==
- Willa Cather had visited Brownville in 1894 to write an article for the fortieth anniversary of its settlement.
