= Hickman, Nebraska =

- City
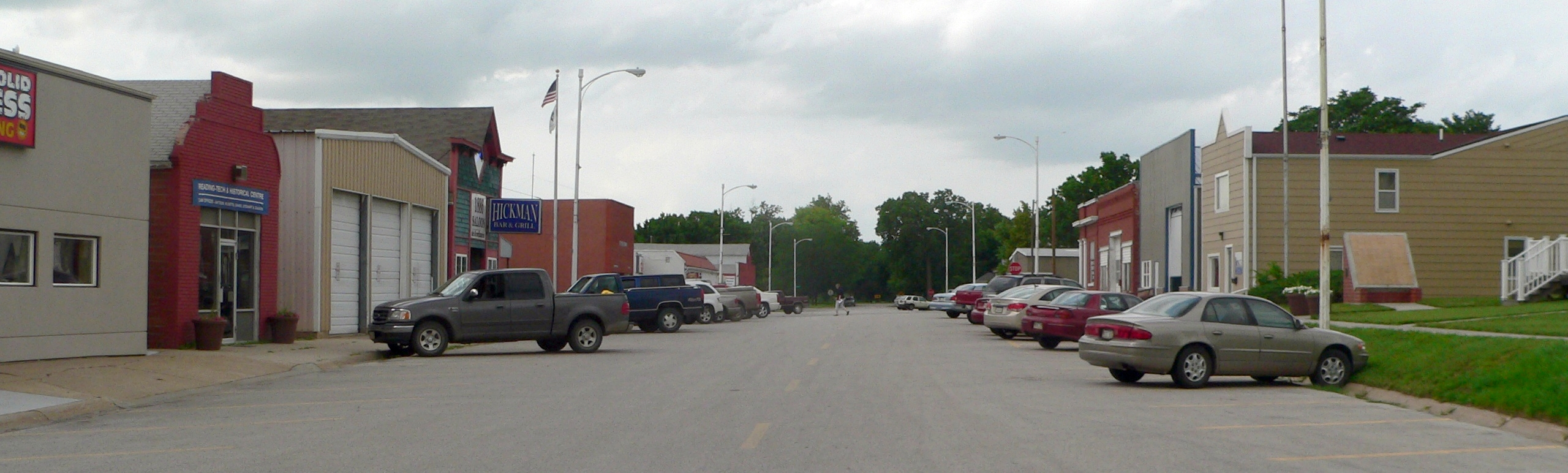
- Downtown Hickman: Locust Street

- Location of Hickman, Nebraska
- Coordinates: 40°37′30″N 96°37′47″W
- Country: United States
- State: Nebraska
- County: Lancaster

Area
  - Total: 0.89 sq mi (2.31 km^{2})
  - Land: 0.89 sq mi (2.31 km^{2})
  - Water: 0 sq mi (0.00 km^{2})
- Elevation: 1,270 ft (390 m)

Population (2020)
  - Total: 2,607
  - Density: 2,926/sq mi (1,129.9/km^{2})
- Time zone: UTC-6 (Central (CST))
  - Summer (DST): UTC-5 (CDT)
- ZIP code: 68372
- Area code: 402
- FIPS code: 31-22325
- GNIS feature ID: 2394370
- Website: www.hickman.ne.gov

Hickman is a city in Lancaster County, Nebraska, United States. It is part of the Lincoln, Nebraska Metropolitan Statistical Area. The population was 2,607 at the 2020 census.

== History ==
Hickman was founded by Reverend C. H. Heckman and incorporated in 1885. Prior to 1885, the city of Hickman was known as Heckman; named after founder Reverend C. H. Heckman. Prior to 1866, the land was open prairie. Reverend Heckman was an early settler purchasing land near the Salt Creek. Heckman was platted in 1872 by Reverend Heckman and Samuel Egger after a station was accepted on the route of the Atchison and Nebraska Railroad from Rulo, Nebraska to Lincoln, Nebraska. However, when Reverend Heckman and Samuel Egger submitted the plat for Heckman to Lancaster County for recording, Heckman was misspelled as Hickman. The city was incorporated as Hickman in 1885.

== Geography ==
According to the United States Census Bureau, the city has a total area of 0.72 square miles (1.86 km^{2}), all land.

== Demographics ==
Historical population
Census	Pop.	Note	%±
1890	341		—
1900	382		12.0%
1910	388		1.6%
1920	380		−2.1%
1930	302		−20.5%
1940	320		6.0%
1950	279		−12.8%
1960	288		3.2%
1970	415		44.1%
1980	687		65.5%
1990	1,081		57.4%
2000	1,084		0.3%
2010	1,657		52.9%
2020	2,607		57.3%
U.S. Decennial Census; 2015 Estimate

=== 2020 census ===
As of the 2020 census, Hickman had a population of 2,607. The median age was 32.8 years. 36.2% of residents were under the age of 18 and 9.7% of residents were 65 years of age or older. For every 100 females there were 99.2 males, and for every 100 females age 18 and over there were 93.9 males age 18 and over.

0.0% of residents lived in urban areas, while 100.0% lived in rural areas.

There were 827 households in Hickman, of which 57.8% had children under the age of 18 living in them. Of all households, 69.5% were married-couple households, 9.6% were households with a male householder and no spouse or partner present, and 16.6% were households with a female householder and no spouse or partner present. About 15.6% of all households were made up of individuals and 8.6% had someone living alone who was 65 years of age or older.

There were 879 housing units, of which 5.9% were vacant. The homeowner vacancy rate was 1.0% and the rental vacancy rate was 24.1%.

Racial composition as of the 2020 census
Race	Number	Percent
White	2,483	95.2%
Black or African American	13	0.5%
American Indian and Alaska Native	4	0.2%
Asian	8	0.3%
Native Hawaiian and Other Pacific Islander	0	0.0%
Some other race	18	0.7%
Two or more races	81	3.1%
Hispanic or Latino (of any race)	70	2.7%

=== 2010 census ===
As of the census of 2010, there were 1,657 people, 587 households, and 463 families residing in the city. The population density was 2,301.4 inhabitants per square mile (888.6/km^{2}). There were 609 housing units at an average density of 845.8 per square mile (326.6/km^{2}). The racial makeup of the city was 98.2% White, 0.4% African American, 0.2% Asian, 0.3% from other races, and 0.9% from two or more races. Hispanic or Latino of any race were 1.6% of the population.

There were 587 households, of which 46.7% had children under the age of 18 living with them, 65.9% were married couples living together, 8.9% had a female householder with no husband present, 4.1% had a male householder with no wife present, and 21.1% were non-families. 18.1% of all households were made up of individuals, and 9% had someone living alone who was 65 years of age or older. The average household size was 2.82 and the average family size was 3.22.

The median age in the city was 31.8 years. 33.2% of residents were under the age of 18; 5.7% were between the ages of 18 and 24; 30.2% were from 25 to 44; 23.1% were from 45 to 64; and 7.7% were 65 years of age or older. The gender makeup of the city was 51.7% male and 48.3% female.

== Notable people ==
- Adam Mania (born 1983), swimmer
- Bernice Slote (1913–1983), English professor

== See also ==
- Norris Forest School Arboretum
- Norris School District 160
