= Lincoln Children's Zoo =

Children's zoo in Lincoln, Nebraska, US

- Zoo logo

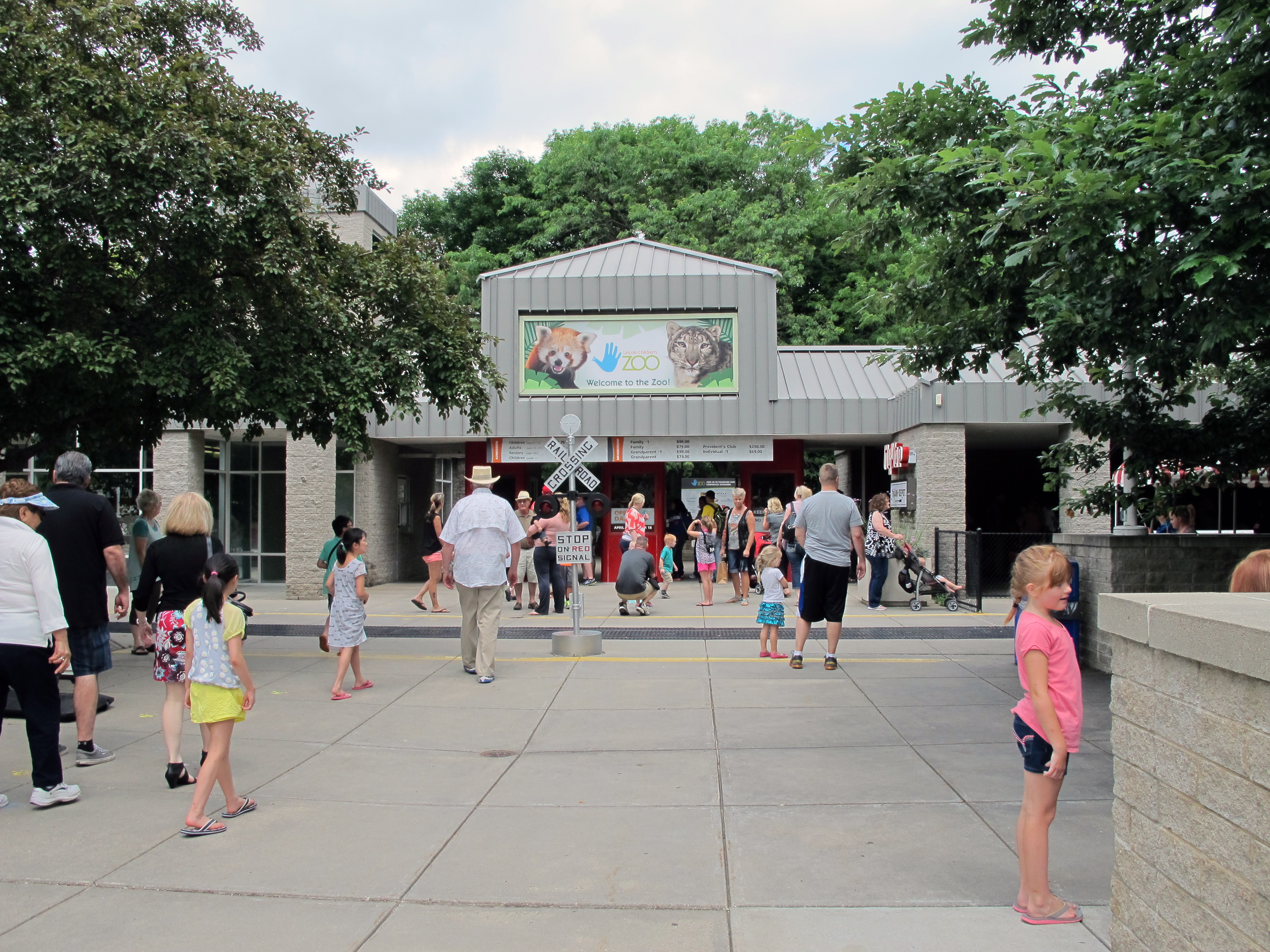
- Entrance to the zoo
- Interactive map of Lincoln Children's Zoo
- 40.800175°N 96.679141°W
- Date opened: July 23, 1965
- Location: Lincoln, Nebraska, United States
- Land area: 20 acres (8.1 ha)
- No. of animals: More than 300
- No. of species: 103
- Memberships: AZA
- Public transit: StarTran
- Website: www.lincolnzoo.org

The Lincoln Children's Zoo is a children's zoo located in Lincoln, Nebraska, United States. Designed specifically for children to experience interactive, up-close encounters with all of the zoo's animals, Lincoln Children's Zoo has been accredited by the Association of Zoos and Aquariums (AZA).

With nearly 200,000 visitors each year, Lincoln Children's Zoo is the third most attended arts and science attraction in Nebraska. The Lincoln Children's Zoo is a privately funded, 10-acre zoo and is the largest attended zoo per acre in the United States. The zoo is open year round as of March 2019. Currently, the zoo is home to over 400 animals and over 40 endangered animals, including the Sumatran tiger and Matschie's tree-kangaroo.

== History ==
Arnott Folsom began planning for a children's zoo that would allow children to engage and interact with animals with his personal funds in 1959. In 1963, construction on the zoo's original property of three acres was still taking place but the railroad tracks for the zoo's train were completed. Folsom had the idea to sell train tickets for a ride on the zoo's train, then called the "Iron Horse", to help fundraise to finish construction of the zoo. In 1964, Folsom hired a full-time train crew and the train drove approximately 2,800 miles, selling over 150,000 tickets from 1963 to 1964. Lincoln Children's Zoo opened on three acres of city land in 1965. The zoo began with about 120 animals, all of which were sold at the end of the season each year.

- 1973: The zoo hired permanent staff, allowing animals to be kept year-round.
- 1978: Animal Kingdom building opened, making the zoo's first all-weather exhibit space.
- 1997: New habitats for river otters, spectacled bears, Bactrian camels and gelada baboons. The zoo also welcomed Amur leopards and New Guinea singing dogs for the first time. Stegosaurus Fountain and Zooville Square were remodeled, the education complex and veterinary facility opened and "Zoo School" opened in collaboration with the Lincoln Public Schools.
- 2001: The Butterfly Pavilion opened and the zoo started planning for Antelope Triangle Park
- 2002: The name of the railroad was changed from Iron Horse Railroad to ZO&O Railroad and the zoo's original 38-year-old, 2 ft. narrow gauge Chance Rides C.P. Huntington locomotive was replaced by a new C.P. Huntington locomotive
- 2003: Season opened with new De Brazza's monkeys, a new home for the zoo's bald eagles and a new children's play area.
- 2004: Camelot Commons Education Center opened, pot-bellied seahorses and some harbor seals were introduced to the zoo.
- 2005: The zoo celebrated its 40-year anniversary and "Dromedary Dock", a feeding station to let visitors feed camels, opened.
- 2008: Stegosaurus Fountain was renovated into Stego's Big Dig and Laura's Butterfly Pavilion opened as a permanent home for butterflies.
- 2009: The zoo had reached about 350 animals and had expanded to the current 10 acres.
- 2011: The Humboldt penguin exhibit opened, bringing Humboldt penguins to Nebraska for the first time.
- 2013: Lincoln Children's Zoo "Iron Horse" train celebrates 50 year anniversary.
- 2014: Animal Encounter Stage was built through funding by the Abel Foundation, giving children daily opportunities to meet and greet some of the zoo's animals, including a bobcat, a baby alligator and fennec foxes.
- 2019: New giraffes, spider monkeys, red pandas, and Sumatran tigers arrived near the new entrance to the zoo for the first time. Zoo opens year-round instead of closing for the winter.
- 2020: The zoo welcomed two new species, the Cheetah and the Giant anteater, plus a 25 foot tall play structure (Ellie the Elephant).
- 2021: Three snow leopards died after testing positive for SARS-CoV-2, the virus which causes COVID-19 in humans. Two Sumatran tigers fully recovered.

== Zoofari ==
In March 2013, Lincoln Children's Zoo partnered with Larry the Cable Guy's Git-R-Done Foundation to create Zoofari with Larry the Cable Guy. This partnership gave hundreds of children's hospitals and rehabilitation centers across the country the opportunity to bring the zoo to their patients. Filmed on location at Lincoln Children's Zoo, Zoofari features Larry the Cable Guy interacting with the zoo's animals and zookeepers in a fun and educational manner. The Git-R-Done Foundation sends the Zoofari DVDs, free of charge, to children's hospitals and hospitals with children's wards across the United States. Larry the Cable Guy has also been featured on The Tonight Show with Jay Leno to discuss Zoofari and the goals of the project.

== Exhibits ==
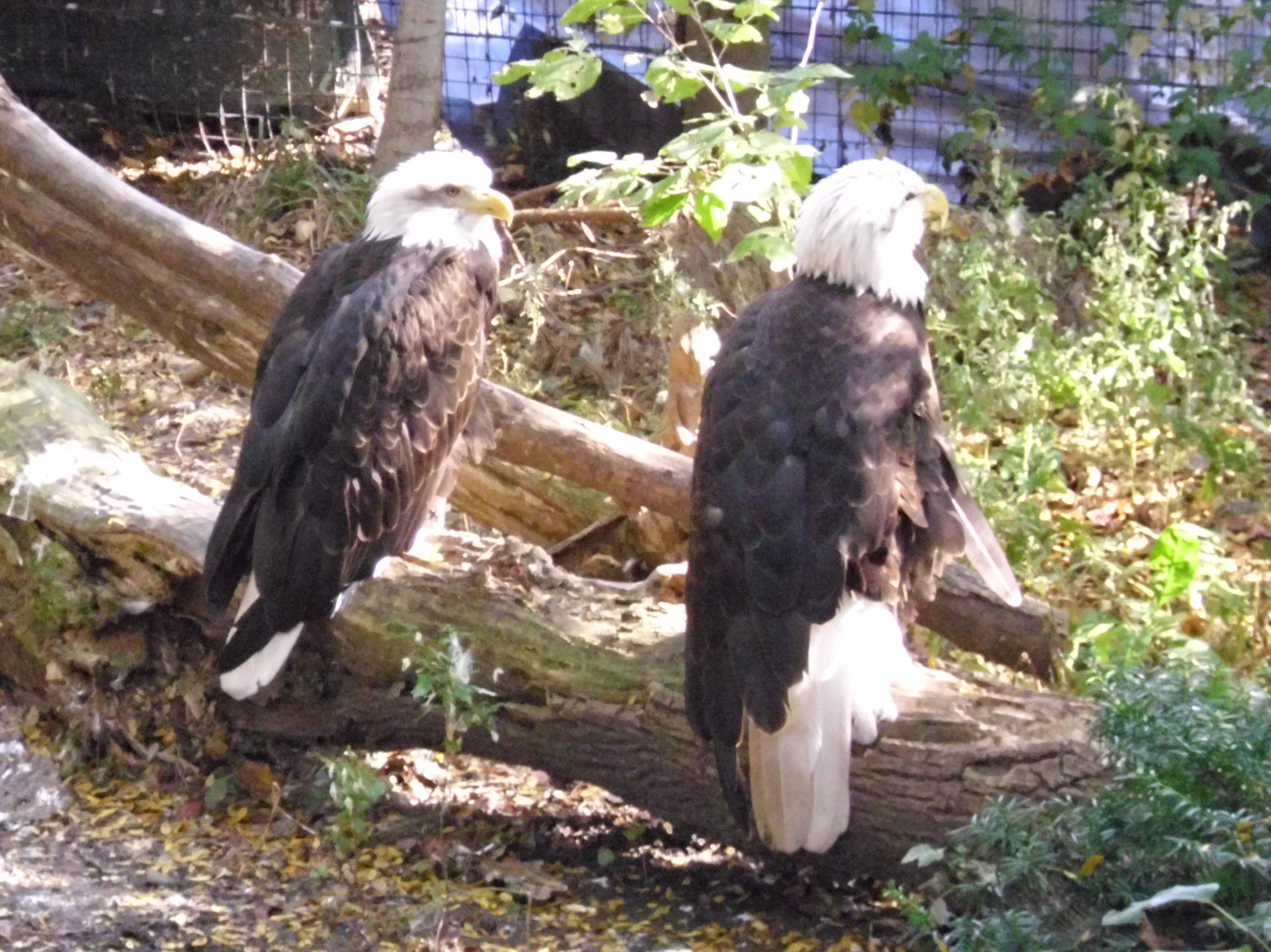
Pair of bald eagles

The zoo has a number of different exhibits.

Critter Outpost
The Critter Outpost houses guinea pigs, doves, ferrets, and many other small animals.
The Hive
An insect house that contains a variety of reptiles, amphibians and arthropods from around the world, including Madagascar hissing cockroaches, tarantulas, and scorpions.
The Secret Jungle
A Jungle-themed exhibit that houses black-headed spider monkeys and geoffroy's spider monkeys. There is also a play area for children.
Jungle Outpost
This Educational exhibit houses chinchillas, the western hognose snake, a baby american alligator, and other small animals.
Red panda Conservation Center
Humboldt Penguins
Laura's Butterfly Pavilion
Giraffe Enclosure
Tiger Forest

== Education ==
Wild Safari Theater

Children have the opportunity to interact with different animals at the Wild Safari Theater, educating visitors about the animals at the zoo. Shows are held daily at varying times throughout the day.

Summer Zoo Camps

Zoo Camps are held in one week sessions throughout the summer for children ages 3–12. Children ages 14–18 have the opportunity to travel with the zoo to experience learning about animals in different areas in the world.

Volunteers

Children and adults can volunteer as a Zoo Crew member to assist with varying tasks throughout the zoo, such as helping with presentations, running Critter Outpost, leading pony rides, train driver, and many other activities.

== Events ==
Wild Wednesdays

Each Wild Wednesday has a different theme and includes animal demonstrations and other activities for visitors.
