= Gilman Park Arboretum =

Arboretum in Pierce, Nebraska, United States

Coordinates: 42°12′02″N 97°31′08″W

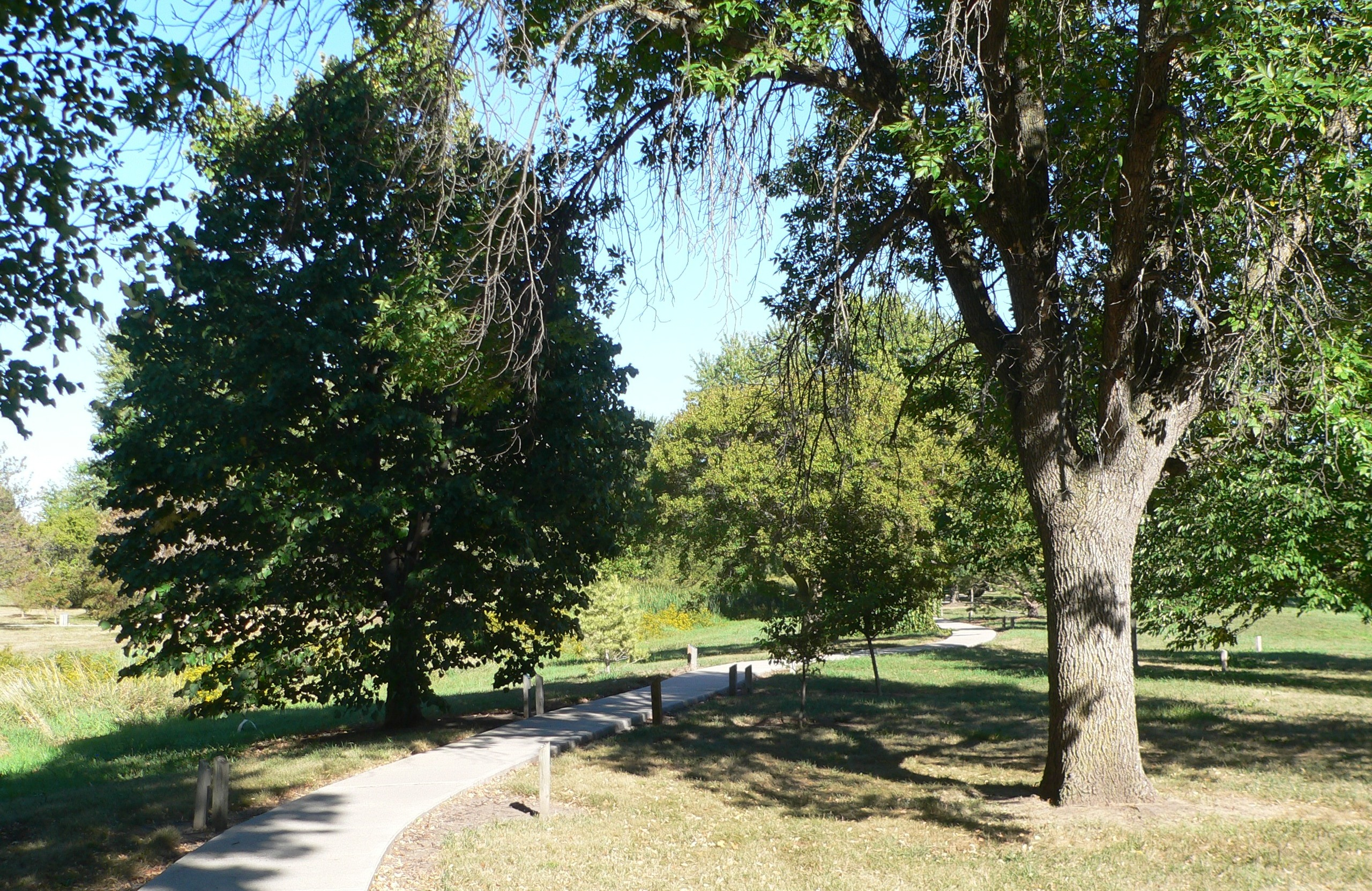
- A path in the arboretum.
- Interactive map of Gilman Park Arboretum
- Website: Official website

Gilman Park Arboretum, consisting of 14 acres (57,000 m^{2}), is an arboretum in Pierce, Nebraska.

The Arboretum was established in 1993, and features 647 woody plants, including 243 different labeled varieties of trees and shrubs, and more than eighty different varieties of perennials and ornamental grasses. The Arboretum is sited around Bill Cox Memorial Lake, has a 1.2 mile (1.9 km) path, and the following distinct gardens: Arboretum Entrance Garden, Butterfly Garden, Historic Bridge Garden, Wildflower & Ornamental Grass Garden, and Xeriscape Garden.

== See also ==
- List of botanical gardens in the United States
