= Alice Abel Arboretum =

Arboretum in Lincoln, Nebraska, US

Coordinates: 40°50′20″N 96°39′02″W

- Interactive map of Alice Abel Arboretum

The Alice Abel Arboretum is a 25 acres (10 hectares) arboretum located at 5000 St. Paul Street on the campus of Nebraska Wesleyan University in Lincoln, Nebraska.

== Exhibits ==
The Arboretum includes over 100 species of trees, shrubs and herbaceous plants. Its woody plants include:

- Abies concolor
- Acer campestre
- Acer ginnala
- Acer rubrum
- Acer saccharinum
- Acer saccharum
- Aesculus hippocastanum
- Betula papyrifera
- Catalpa speciosa
- Celtis occidentalis
- Cercis canadensis
- Cornus alba 'Argenteomarginata'
- Crataegus crus-galli
- Euonymus alatus 'Compactus'
- Fraxinus americana 'Autumn Purple'
- Fraxinus pennsylvanica
- Ginkgo biloba
- Gymnocladus dioicus
- Juniperus virginiana
- Juniperus virginiana 'Taylor'
- Magnolia soulangiana
- Malus spp.
- Phellodendron amurense
- Picea abies
- Picea pungens 'Glauca'
- Pinus mugo
- Pinus nigra
- Pinus ponderosa
- Pinus strobus
- Pinus sylvestris
- Platanus occidentalis
- Populus deltoides
- Prunus padus
- Pseudotsuga menziesii
- Quercus bicolor
- Quercus macrocarpa
- Quercus palustris
- Quercus robur
- Quercus rubra
- Rhus spp.
- Spiraea spp.
- Syringa spp.
- Taxodium distichum
- Taxus cuspidata
- Tilia euchlora
- Ulmus americana
- Viburnum lentago

== See also ==
- List of botanical gardens in the United States
