= Pierce, Nebraska =

- City
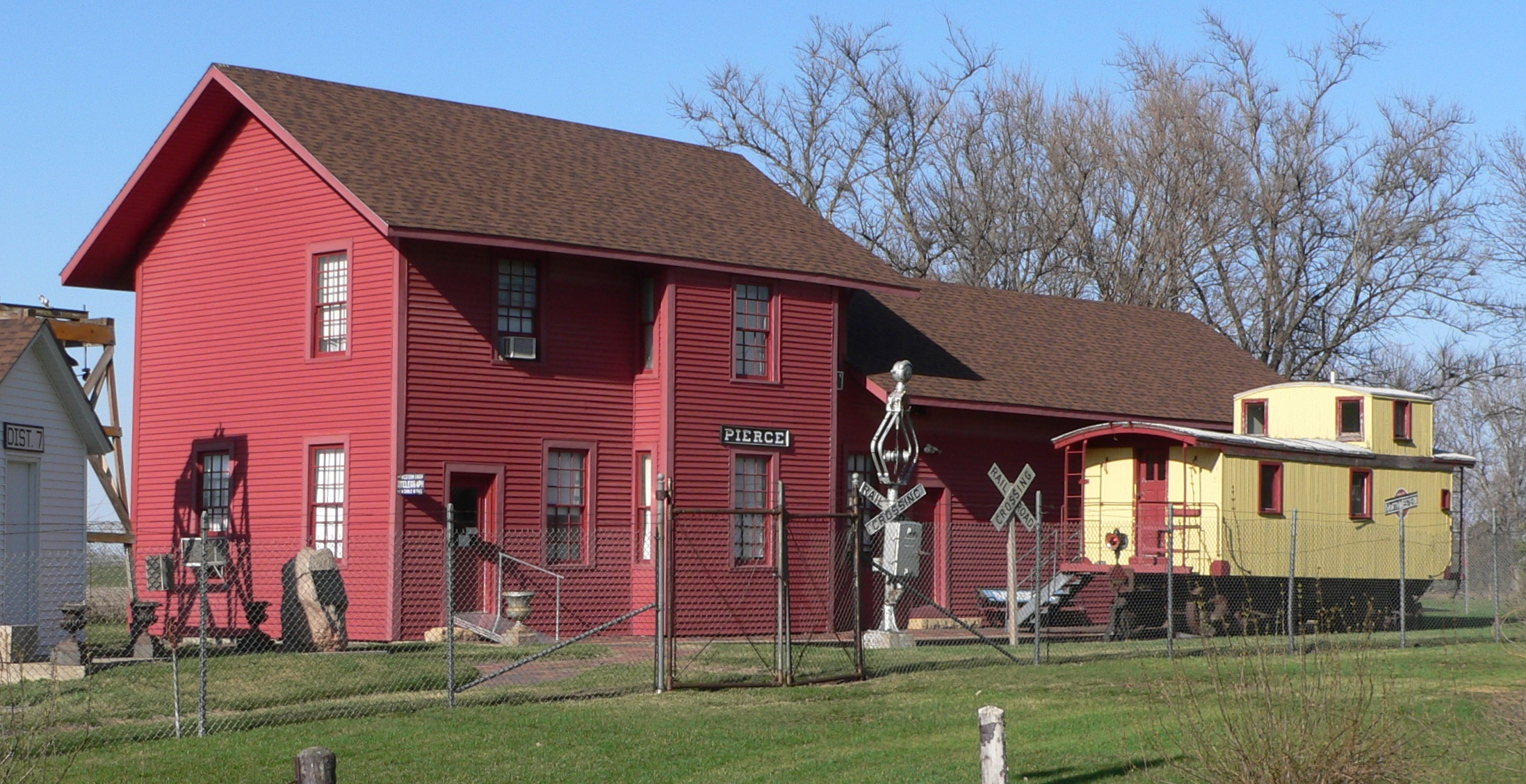
- Chicago & North Western Railway depot, now part of the Pierce Historical Society Museum.

- Location of Pierce, Nebraska
- Coordinates: 42°11′57″N 97°31′43″W
- Country: United States
- State: Nebraska
- County: Pierce

Area
  - Total: 0.94 sq mi (2.43 km^{2})
  - Land: 0.92 sq mi (2.37 km^{2})
  - Water: 0.023 sq mi (0.06 km^{2})
- Elevation: 1,585 ft (483 m)

Population (2020)
  - Total: 1,845
  - Density: 2,015.7/sq mi (778.28/km^{2})
- Time zone: UTC-6 (Central (CST))
  - Summer (DST): UTC-5 (CDT)
- ZIP code: 68767
- Area code: 402
- FIPS code: 31-39100
- GNIS feature ID: 2396199
- Website: piercenebraska.com

Pierce is a city in and the county seat of Pierce County, Nebraska, United States. As of the 2020 census, Pierce had a population of 1,845.

== History ==
Pierce was platted in 1871, and a courthouse was erected that same year. Like Pierce County, the name honors President Franklin Pierce.

The city became a point of international interest in 2013 due to the Lambrecht auto auction, at which nearly 500 classic cars were put up for sale.

== Geography ==
According to the United States Census Bureau, the city has a total area of 0.93 square miles (2.41 km^{2}), of which, 0.91 square miles (2.36 km^{2}) is land and 0.02 square miles (0.05 km^{2}) is water.

== Demographics ==
Historical population
Census	Pop.	Note	%±
1880	73		—
1890	563		671.2%
1900	770		36.8%
1910	1,200		55.8%
1920	1,105		−7.9%
1930	1,271		15.0%
1940	1,249		−1.7%
1950	1,167		−6.6%
1960	1,216		4.2%
1970	1,360		11.8%
1980	1,535		12.9%
1990	1,615		5.2%
2000	1,774		9.8%
2010	1,767		−0.4%
2020	1,845		4.4%
U.S. Decennial Census; 2012 Estimate

It is part of the Norfolk, Nebraska Micropolitan Statistical Area.

=== 2020 census ===
At the 2020 census there were 1,845 people, 731 households, and 470 families living in the city. The population density was 2050 inhabitants per square mile (791.51/km^{2}). There were 763 housing units at an average density of 847.8 per square mile (327.3/km^{2}). The racial makeup of the city was 94.8% White, 0.27% Native American, 0.16% Asian, 0.05% Pacific Islander, 0.49% from other races, and 3.9% from two or more races. Hispanic or Latino of any race were 2.4%.

Of the 731 households, 34.3% had children under the age of 18 living with them, 64.3% were married couples living together, 21.3% had a female householder with no husband present, 9.2% had a male householder with no wife present, and 26.4% were non-families. 22.7% of households were one person and 13.3% were one person and 65 or older. The average household size was 2.60 and the average family size was 3.07.

The median age was 35.3 years. 23.3% of residents were under the age of 18; 9.3% were between the ages of 18 and 24; 26.3% were from 25 to 44; 25.3% were from 45 to 64; and 15.8% were 65 or older. The gender makeup of the city was 48.6% male and 51.4% female.

=== 2010 census ===
At the 2010 census there were 1,767 people, 706 households, and 479 families living in the city. The population density was 1,941.8 inhabitants per square mile (749.7/km^{2}). There were 747 housing units at an average density of 820.9 per square mile (317.0/km^{2}). The racial makeup of the city was 98.9% White, 0.3% Native American, 0.2% Asian, 0.2% from other races, and 0.5% from two or more races. Hispanic or Latino of any race were 1.2%.

Of the 706 households 34.0% had children under the age of 18 living with them, 53.8% were married couples living together, 8.8% had a female householder with no husband present, 5.2% had a male householder with no wife present, and 32.2% were non-families. 29.3% of households were one person and 16.6% were one person aged 65 or older. The average household size was 2.41 and the average family size was 2.97.

The median age was 40.2 years. 26% of residents were under the age of 18; 6.6% were between the ages of 18 and 24; 23.9% were from 25 to 44; 24.6% were from 45 to 64; and 18.8% were 65 or older. The gender makeup of the city was 49.8% male and 50.2% female.

=== 2000 census ===
At the 2000 census, there were 1,774 people, 682 households, and 465 families living in the city. The population density was 2,023.2 inhabitants per square mile (781.2/km^{2}). There were 736 housing units at an average density of 839.4 per square mile (324.1/km^{2}). The racial makeup of the city was 99.10% White, 0.23% Native American, 0.11% Asian, 0.06% Pacific Islander, 0.23% from other races, and 0.28% from two or more races. Hispanic or Latino of any race were 0.73% of the population.

Of the 682 households 35.0% had children under the age of 18 living with them, 58.1% were married couples living together, 7.5% had a female householder with no husband present, and 31.7% were non-families. 29.5% of households were one person and 17.4% were one person aged 65 or older. The average household size was 2.50 and the average family size was 3.12.

The age distribution was 28.2% under the age of 18, 8.3% from 18 to 24, 25.4% from 25 to 44, 18.1% from 45 to 64, and 20.1% 65 or older. The median age was 38 years. For every 100 females, there were 92.2 males. For every 100 females age 18 and over, there were 87.6 males.

The median household income was $35,288, and the median family income was $43,068. Males had a median income of $27,436 versus $21,034 for females. The per capita income for the city was $15,702. About 6.7% of families and 8.6% of the population were below the poverty line, including 6.9% of those under age 18 and 14.4% of those age 65 or over.

== Points of interest ==
- Gilman Park Arboretum
- Willow Creek State Recreation Area, located 4 miles southwest of Pierce.
