= Maxwell Arboretum =

Arboretum and botanical garden in Lincoln, Nebraska, United States

- Interactive map of Maxwell Arboretum
- Type: Botanical garden
- Location: 3800 East Campus Loop S Lincoln, Nebraska
- Coordinates: 40°49′45″N 96°39′55″W
- Area: 14 acres (5.7 ha)
- Established: 1967
- Founder: Earl Maxwell
- Owner: University of Nebraska–Lincoln

The Earl G. Maxwell Arboretum is a fourteen-acre arboretum and botanical garden on East Campus of the University of Nebraska–Lincoln in Lincoln, Nebraska. It was formally established in 1967 and named in honor of longtime university forester Earl Maxwell, who personally planted many of the arboretum's thousands of plant species.

== History ==
Earl Maxwell served the University of Nebraska as a forester from 1934 until 1952. During his tenure, he oversaw the planting of millions of trees across the state as part of the Great Plains Shelterbelt project. Maxwell also personally planted over one hundred species, primarily woody plants suited for Nebraska's harsh winters, on a five-acre plot of land near the southern edge of NU's Farm Campus (now East Campus). Maxwell continued to walk the grounds almost daily until his death in November 1966, after which the university established his "trial area" as a botanical garden and formally dedicated it as the Earl G. Maxwell Arboretum in 1969.

The Campus Beautification Committee was established to maintain the Maxwell Arboretum and improve the surrounding areas of Farm Campus. Throughout the 1970s, the committee established a one-acre teaching prairie and planted rows of Araucaria columnaris. The university and state of Nebraska jointly created the Nebraska Statewide Arboretum in 1975, with the Arbor Lodge State Historical Park and Arboretum and Maxwell Arboretum as its flagship sites.

The Karl Loerch Gazebo was erected in 1982 to honor Maxwell's successor as university forester and serve as a formal entrance to the arboretum.

The arboretum has nearly tripled in size since Maxwell began planting in the 1930s, now spanning approximately fourteen acres. It is maintained by the university's Landscape Services department.

== Species ==
The arboretum features thousands of species of trees, shrubs, and perennials. Mature oaks include specimens of black, bur, English, pin, sawtooth, shingle, shumard, and swamp white varieties. Other trees include blue ash, chestnut, pawpaw, sweetgum, black tupelo, and Scots pine. Additional plants include lilacs, cold-hardy rhododendrons, and viburnums, as well as over eighty hosta cultivars, and a prairie with native wildflowers and bluestem and Indian grass.

== See also ==
- List of botanical gardens and arboretums in the United States
