= Brownville, Nebraska =

- Village
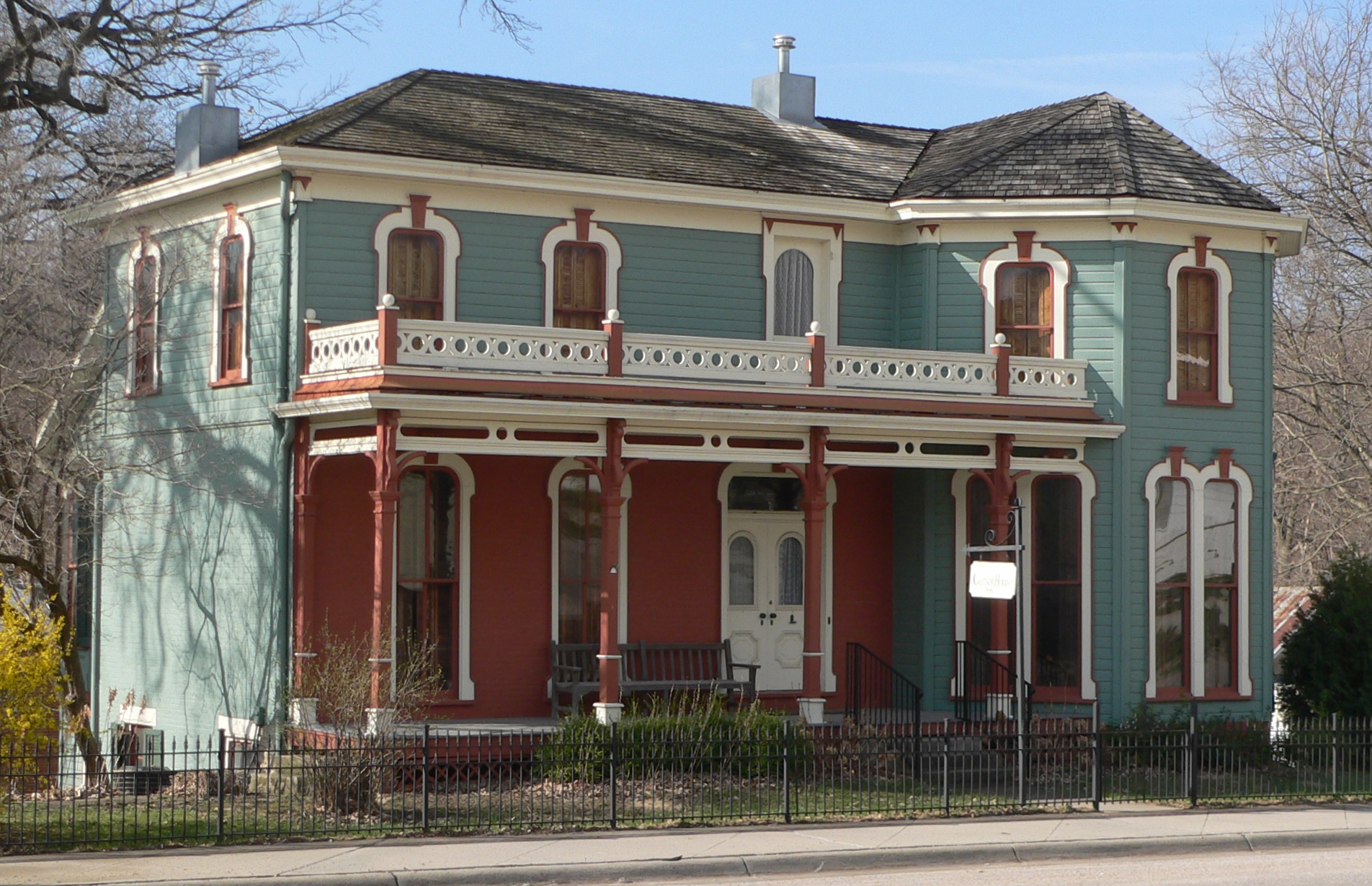
- Carson House on Main Street, in Brownville Historic District

- Location of Brownville, Nebraska
- Coordinates: 40°23′49″N 95°39′34″W
- Country: United States
- State: Nebraska
- County: Nemaha

Area
  - Total: 0.65 sq mi (1.69 km^{2})
  - Land: 0.65 sq mi (1.69 km^{2})
  - Water: 0 sq mi (0.00 km^{2})
- Elevation: 958 ft (292 m)

Population (2020)
  - Total: 142
  - Estimate (2021): 142
  - Density: 218/sq mi (84.0/km^{2})
- Time zone: UTC-6 (Central (CST))
  - Summer (DST): UTC-5 (CDT)
- ZIP code: 68321
- Area code: 402
- FIPS code: 31-06750
- GNIS feature ID: 0827698
- Website: www.brownvillenebraska.gov

Brownville is a village in Nemaha County, Nebraska, United States. The population was 142 at the 2020 census.

== History ==
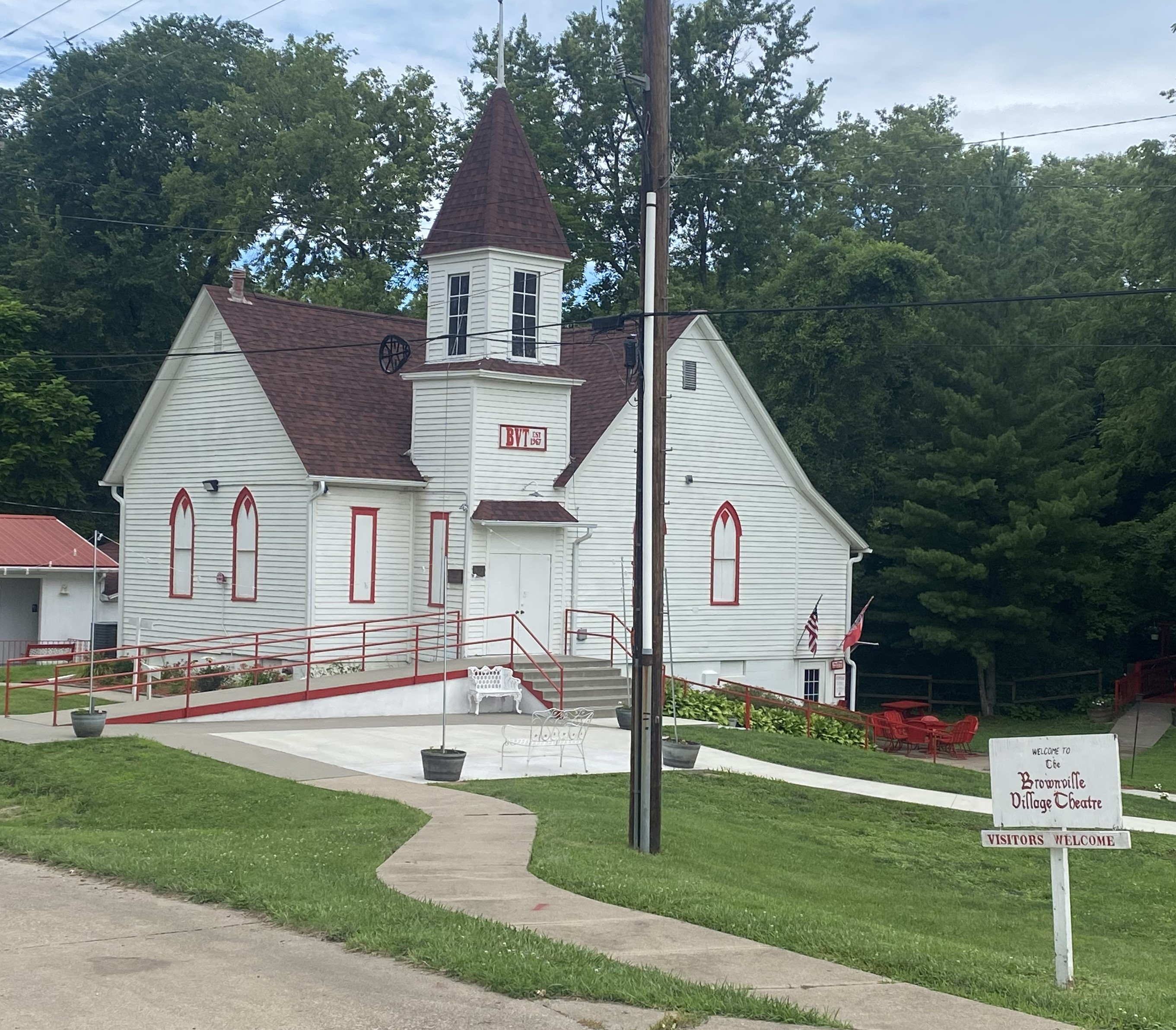
Brownville Village Theatre in Brownville, Nebraska

Established in 1854 and incorporated in 1856, Brownville was the largest town in the Nebraska Territory, with a population of 1,309 by 1880. Bordering slave-holding Missouri, the town became an important port on the Missouri River. Daniel Freeman, the first homesteader to file a claim under the Homestead Act of 1862, staked his claim at a New Year's Eve party in Brownville.

The first post office was called Brownsville and existed from 1853 to 1870, when it was changed to Brownville; however the name changed may have occurred later since a 1909 Post Office Department map shows the former name.

The rise of the railroad was ultimately Brownville's undoing. The railroads siphoned traffic away from the Missouri River's steamboats. Brownville's attempt to secure a railroad of its own was severely botched and led to immense tax increases to pay the bonds for the failed venture. This drove most of the population away and led to the county seat being transferred to Auburn in 1885. In 1856 Thomas Weston Tipton moved to the town to serve as a minister. He later became a U.S. Senator, and ran an unsuccessful campaign for Governor of Nebraska. Omaha land magnates Herman and Augustus Kountze held large holdings in the early town.

After the American Civil War, David Mercer established a law practice in the town. Mercer later served as a long-time U.S. Representative from Nebraska. The Nebraska State Fair was held in the town in 1870 and 1871. That year Eugene Gilmore, the future acting Governor-General of the Philippines, was born in the town.

The Brownville Bridge was built over the Missouri River in 1939. Today it is on the National Register of Historic Places. Owing to its place in Nebraska history, Brownville is primarily a tourist attraction with several old houses opened for tours or converted into museums. Art galleries and wineries in and near Brownville have also helped to make the town an increasingly attractive getaway for residents of the region's larger cities. Omaha's River City Star was built in the town in 1967, and was originally named the Belle of Brownville. The Governor Furnas Arboretum was planted in the city in 1992. The arboretum is named in honor of Nebraska's second governor, Robert W. Furnas, the signer of the first declaration of Arbor Day. The Cooper Nuclear Station is south of the city. In 1995 a mild tornado blew through the town.

== Geography ==
According to the United States Census Bureau, the village has a total area of 0.65 square miles (1.68 km^{2}), all land.

=== Climate ===
Climate data for Brownville, Nebraska
| Month | Jan | Feb | Mar | Apr | May | Jun | Jul | Aug | Sep | Oct | Nov | Dec | Year |
|---|---|---|---|---|---|---|---|---|---|---|---|---|---|
| Record high °F (°C) | 70 (21) | 81 (27) | 91 (33) | 99 (37) | 102 (39) | 109 (43) | 110 (43) | 109 (43) | 107 (42) | 98 (37) | 84 (29) | 78 (26) | 110 (43) |
| Mean daily maximum °F (°C) | 34 (1) | 41 (5) | 53 (12) | 65 (18) | 76 (24) | 86 (30) | 90 (32) | 88 (31) | 80 (27) | 68 (20) | 50 (10) | 37 (3) | 64 (18) |
| Mean daily minimum °F (°C) | 14 (−10) | 20 (−7) | 30 (−1) | 41 (5) | 52 (11) | 62 (17) | 66 (19) | 64 (18) | 55 (13) | 43 (6) | 30 (−1) | 18 (−8) | 41 (5) |
| Record low °F (°C) | −22 (−30) | −23 (−31) | −21 (−29) | 7 (−14) | 26 (−3) | 39 (4) | 43 (6) | 38 (3) | 23 (−5) | 13 (−11) | −5 (−21) | −27 (−33) | −27 (−33) |
| Average precipitation inches (mm) | 0.84 (21) | 1.09 (28) | 2.46 (62) | 2.93 (74) | 4.27 (108) | 3.73 (95) | 4.41 (112) | 3.49 (89) | 3.54 (90) | 2.49 (63) | 2.02 (51) | 1.09 (28) | 32.36 (821) |
| Average snowfall inches (cm) | 5.7 (14) | 6.2 (16) | 5.3 (13) | 1 (2.5) | 0 (0) | 0 (0) | 0 (0) | 0 (0) | 0 (0) | 0.2 (0.51) | 1.7 (4.3) | 5.7 (14) | 25.8 (64.31) |

== Demographics ==
Historical population
| Census | Pop. | Note | %± |
|---|---|---|---|
| 1860 | 425 | | — |
| 1870 | 1,305 | | 207.1% |
| 1880 | 1,309 | | 0.3% |
| 1890 | 980 | | −25.1% |
| 1900 | 718 | | −26.7% |
| 1910 | 457 | | −36.4% |
| 1920 | 463 | | 1.3% |
| 1930 | 426 | | −8.0% |
| 1940 | 581 | | 36.4% |
| 1950 | 357 | | −38.6% |
| 1960 | 243 | | −31.9% |
| 1970 | 174 | | −28.4% |
| 1980 | 203 | | 16.7% |
| 1990 | 148 | | −27.1% |
| 2000 | 146 | | −1.4% |
| 2010 | 132 | | −9.6% |
| 2020 | 139 | | 5.3% |
| 2021 (est.) | 142 | ▲ | 2.2% |
U.S. Decennial Census

=== 2010 census ===
As of the census of 2010, there were 132 people, 73 households, and 40 families residing in the village. The population density was 203.1 inhabitants per square mile (78.4/km^{2}). There were 103 housing units at an average density of 158.5 per square mile (61.2/km^{2}). The racial makeup of the village was 97.7% White, 0.8% Native American, 0.8% from other races, and 0.8% from two or more races. Hispanic or Latino of any race were 3.0% of the population.

There were 73 households, of which 9.6% had children under the age of 18 living with them, 46.6% were married couples living together, 1.4% had a female householder with no husband present, 6.8% had a male householder with no wife present, and 45.2% were non-families. 42.5% of all households were made up of individuals, and 20.5% had someone living alone who was 65 years of age or older. The average household size was 1.81 and the average family size was 2.30.

The median age in the village was 60.8 years. 6.8% of residents were under the age of 18; 6.9% were between the ages of 18 and 24; 7.6% were from 25 to 44; 40.1% were from 45 to 64; and 38.6% were 65 years of age or older. The gender makeup of the village was 53.0% male and 47.0% female.

=== 2000 census ===
As of the census of 2000, there were 146 people, 74 households, and 40 families residing in the village. The population density was 233.9 inhabitants per square mile (90.3/km^{2}). There were 106 housing units at an average density of 169.8 per square mile (65.6/km^{2}). The racial makeup of the village was 99.32% White, and 0.68% from two or more races.

There were 74 households, out of which 20.3% had children under the age of 18 living with them, 44.6% were married couples living together, 5.4% had a female householder with no husband present, and 44.6% were non-families. 40.5% of all households were made up of individuals, and 17.6% had someone living alone who was 65 years of age or older. The average household size was 1.97 and the average family size was 2.63.

In the village, the population was spread out, with 18.5% under the age of 18, 5.5% from 18 to 24, 19.2% from 25 to 44, 34.2% from 45 to 64, and 22.6% who were 65 years of age or older. The median age was 51 years. For every 100 females, there were 117.9 males. For every 100 females age 18 and over, there were 108.8 males.

The median income for a household in the village was $34,375, and the median income for a family was $51,000. Males had a median income of $35,750 versus $28,438 for females. The per capita income for the village was $20,928. There were 11.5% of families and 15.9% of the population living below the poverty line, including 15.2% of under eighteens and 17.9% of those over 64.

== Places ==
Brownville sits in the Loess Hills above the Missouri River Valley. It is home to one of Nebraska's two nuclear power plants. The Cooper Nuclear Station is owned and operated by the Nebraska Public Power District. U.S. Route 136, which meets Nebraska Highway 67 near Brownville, runs through the town, exiting the state via the Brownville Bridge. At Brownville bicycle riders along the Lewis & Clark Trail Bicycle Route can choose between the Steamboat Trace or the Hamburg Option.

== Education ==
The school district is Auburn Public Schools.

== Notable people ==
- Eugene Allen Gilmore, Acting Governor-General of the Philippines in 1927.
- Thomas Tipton, one of the first two United States senators from Nebraska.

== Cultural references ==
- Willa Cather's 1897 short story A Resurrection is set in Brownville, and it includes a description of the town.
