= Flag of Lincoln, Nebraska =

Municipal flag

City of Lincoln, Nebraska

The flag of Lincoln, Nebraska consists of a horizontal bicolor of teal and deep blue, with a stylized beacon in the center, with eight golden lines from the top-left and top-right connecting to it.

Following a design contest, the current flag was adopted in 2022 to replace the original city flag, which had been in use since 1931.

== Design ==
According to the city, the circular beacon in the center of the flag symbolizes "the hope and optimism that the people of Lincoln are known for". It combines a stylized depiction of the Nebraska State Capitol with the street grid of downtown Lincoln. The central star marks the intersection where O Street divides North and South 13th Street. The eight horizontal and diagonal lines surrounding it depict the sun rising over the horizon.

Scheme	Deep Blue	Teal	Gold	White
Pantone	309 C	7707 C	728 C	N/A

The teal is a representation of Lincoln’s "verdant tapestry" of green spaces and parks. The deep blue represents groundwater aquifers, a significant water supply for Lincoln and the surrounding region. According to City of Lincoln, "The warm gold represents a bright future and a place where all are warmly welcomed."

== History ==
=== Original flag ===
City of Lincoln, Nebraska

In 1928 a visiting group from the Rotary Club of Lincoln, England gifted a flag of their city to Lincoln, Nebraska. This gift inspired a flag design contest sponsored by the Lincoln Chamber of Commerce.

The chairman of the chamber's flag committee, Frank D. Tomson, said that the new city flag “...should find a place in every home within this city and be displayed as a hospitable welcome whenever visitors in numbers from other parts enter our gates.”

=== Redesign and current flag ===
Local interest in a possible flag redesign was sparked in August 2019 after Keil Wilson, a local IT manager and flag enthusiast, brought up the issue at a conference hosted by the non-profit Ignite Lincoln. At this conference, Wilson noted that the flag used at the time "no longer represents the characteristics of Lincoln and does not meet the criteria outlined in basic principles of flag design." The contest, called "ReFlag Lincoln", was hosted from July 1 to August 8, 2021, and would receive over 190 entries. The selection committee involved many local and regional organizations, including the University of Nebraska–Lincoln's College of Arts and Sciences and the Ponca Tribe of Nebraska.

The winning flag, named "All Roads Lead to Lincoln", was created by Ed Mejia, a local artist and graphic designer; his submission was selected by the ReFlag committee from the pool of flag designs submitted by the public. Mejia, who is an immigrant from El Salvador, cited Lincoln's skyline as an inspiration in his design, saying his submission was based on "reflecting on the emotions I felt when I drove into town the first time."
