= Museum of American Speed =

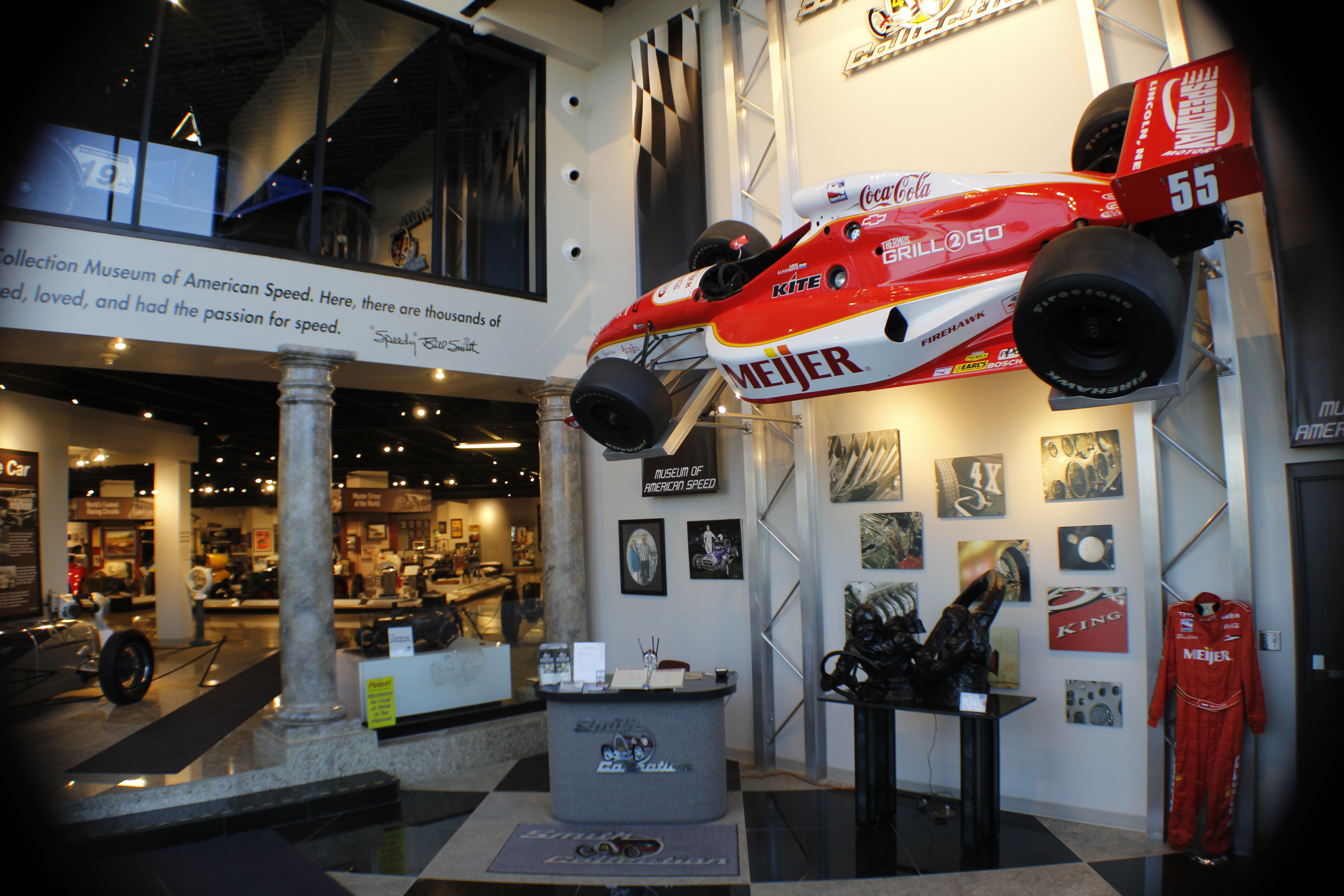
- Museum front entrance
- Established: 1992
- Location: 599 Oak Creek Drive; Lincoln, Nebraska
- Coordinates: 40.818452°N 96.725006°W
- Type: Automobile museum
- Website: www.museumofamericanspeed.org

The Museum of American Speed is a nonprofit automobile museum in Lincoln, Nebraska, exhibiting a collection of American racing vehicles, performance parts, and automotive memorabilia spanning early 20th-century racing to modern Indy Cars. It has been in operation since 1992. As of 2013, the museum was housed in a 135,000 sq ft (12,500 m^{2}) facility.

Exhibits include classic midget cars, go-karts, motorized toys, antique cars, a Soap Box Derby collection, automotive memorabilia, Buck Rogers memorabilia, model cars, as well as a music room that houses a collection of autographed guitars on the ceiling.

== History ==
The Museum of American Speed was opened in 1992 by Bill and Joyce Smith on Van Dorn street in West Lincoln. In 2001, the museum was moved to its current, larger location, also in Lincoln, Nebraska.

In 2026, the museum acquired the complete model car and artifact collection of the International Model Car Builders' Museum in Sandy, Utah. The grand opening of the new model car section was held on July 23–25, 2026.
