= History of Lincoln, Nebraska =

The history of Lincoln, Nebraska began with the settlement of the village of Lancaster in 1856. The county of Lancaster was founded in 1859. Prior to settlement from the westward expansion of the United States, Plains Indians, descendants of indigenous peoples who occupied the area for thousands of years lived in and hunted along Salt Creek. Settlers first came to extract salt from the wild salt flats of Salt Creek. Nebraska was granted statehood March 1, 1867. Soon afterwards a commission created by the State was appointed to locate the State Capital on State lands. The village of Lancaster was chosen for the Capital of Nebraska. The village of Lancaster became Lincoln. Lincoln was named after Abraham Lincoln. The first State Capitol was completed in 1868. Lincoln incorporated on April 1, 1869.

By 1870, railroads began to use Lincoln as a stop westward, and by 1892, Lincoln was a rail center. In the early twentieth century, Volga-German immigrants from Russia began settling in the North Bottoms neighborhood. By 1911, the Omaha-Lincoln-Denver Highway (O-L-D) established through Lincoln. By 1920 the first air field Union Airport was established northeast of Lincoln. As transportation linked Lincoln to points east, west, north and south, the cities population grew to 54,948 by 1920.

The suburban Gateway Mall was completed in 1960. The downtown core began to deteriorate as businesses moved to suburban areas. Revitalization began in 1969 after the passage of State laws for revitalization and beautification of blighted urban areas. Lincoln's first woman mayor, Helen Boosalis, was elected in 1975. Mayor Boosalis was a strong supporter of revitalization and for making Lincoln a home for refugees beginning with the Vietnamese relocation program in the late 1970s. Lincoln was designated as a "Refugee Friendly" city by the U.S. Department of State in 1990. Lincoln's population grew to 258,379 by 2010.

== 19th century ==
=== Pioneer Lincoln ===
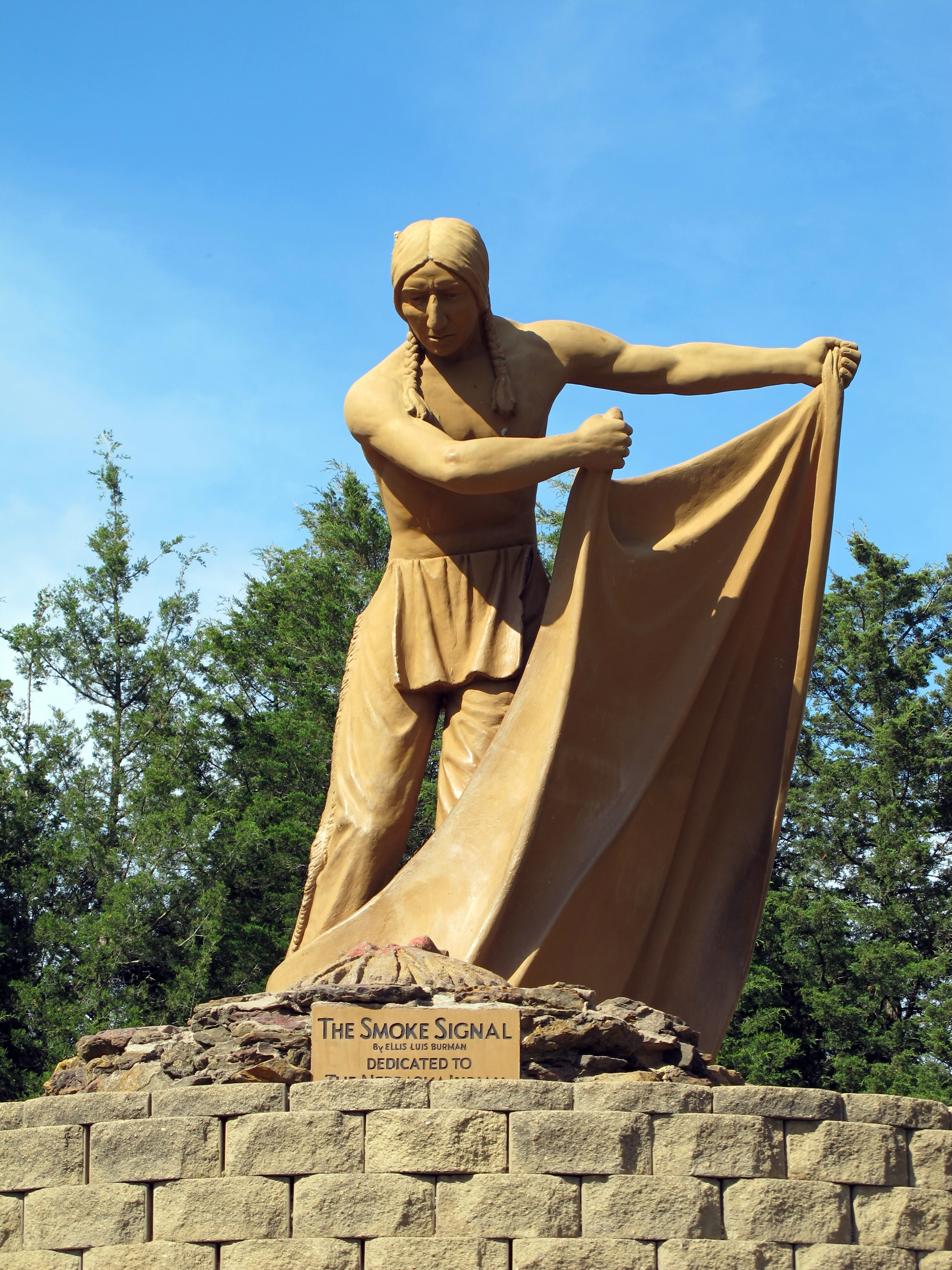
"The Smoke Signal" (1935), a statue dedicated to the Nebraska Indian, by Ellis Luis Burman in Pioneers Park

Prior to the expansion westward of settlers, the prairie was covered with buffalo grass. From 1847 to 1860, the cattle of the west-bound ox trains spread seed that they had eaten along the trails in their journey westward, introducing new plant species to the prairie. Plains Indians, descendants of indigenous peoples who occupied the area for thousands of years, lived in and hunted along Salt Creek. The Pawnee, which included four tribes, lived in villages along the Platte River. The Great Sioux Nation, including the Ihanktowan-Ihanktowana and the Lakota located to the north and west, used Nebraska as a hunting and skirmish ground, although they did not have any long-term settlements in the state. An occasional buffalo could still be seen in the plat of Lincoln in the 1860s.

=== Founding ===
Lincoln was founded in 1856 as the village of Lancaster and became the county seat of the newly created Lancaster County in 1859. The village was sited on the east bank of Salt Creek. The first settlers were attracted to the area due to the abundance of salt. Salt was a commodity used primarily in the preservation of meat. Greater quantities of salt could be obtained by boiling away the water in vats. Once J. Sterling Morton developed his salt mines in Kansas, salt in the village was no longer a viable commodity.

Captain W. T. Donovan, a former steamer captain, and his family settled on Salt Creek in 1856. The Captain was selected to represent the Crescent Company in the production of salt. Other settlers began to settle in the area. During the latter part of 1858, Captain Donovan and his family abandoned the schemes of the Crescent Company and left the area to the Stevens Creek settlement due to the threatening aspect of the Pawnee Indians.

In the fall of 1859, the village settlers met to form a county. A caucus was formed and the committee, which included Captain Donovan from Stevens Creek, selected the village of Lancaster to be the county seat. The county was named Lancaster.

The village had very few inhabitants. After the passage of the 1862 Homestead Act, homesteaders began to inhabit the area. A religious colony led by Reverend John M. Young was the first to settle the village of Lancaster in 1863, and some consider John M. Young to have been the founder of the eventual city of Lincoln. The first plat was dated August 6, 1864. From the north to the south the streets were North, Nebraska, Saline, Washington, Main, Lincoln, College, High and Locust. From west to east streets were numbered one to twelve.

Most settlers abandoned the village in September 1864 due to the 1864 Sioux Indian scare. The Pawnee Indians, who inhabited the area and were not in conflict with the settlers, chased the Sioux out of the area. The village of Lancaster was spared, though other settlements were not. The settlers began to return in 1865 with many taking homesteads.

=== Establishment as state capital ===
The capital of the Nebraska Territory had been Omaha since the creation of the territory in 1854; however, most of the territory's population lived south of the Platte River. After much of the territory south of the Platte River considered annexation to Kansas, the territorial legislature voted to locate the capital city south of the river and as far west as possible.

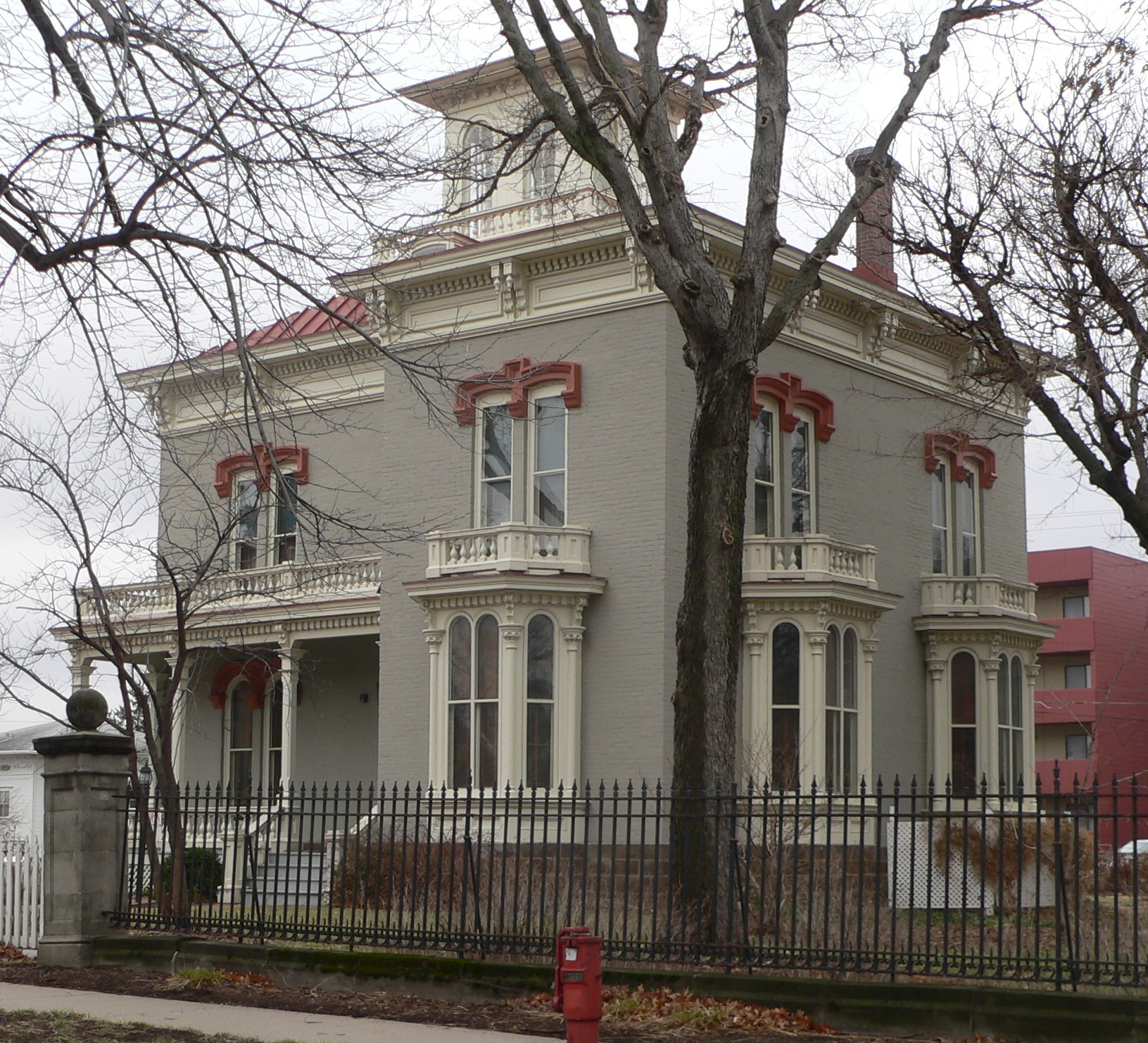
Thomas P. Kennard house

Prior to the vote to remove the capital city from Omaha, a last ditch effort by Omaha Senator J. N. H. Patrick attempted to derail the move by having the future capital city named after recently assassinated President Abraham Lincoln. Many of the people south of the Platte River had been sympathetic to the Confederate cause in the recently concluded Civil War. It was assumed that senators south of the river would not vote to pass the measure if the future capital was named after the former president. In the end, the motion to name the future capital city Lincoln was ineffective and the vote to change the capital's location south of the Platte River was successful with the passage of the Removal Act.

Nebraska was granted statehood on March 1, 1867. The Removal Act called for the formation of a Capital Commission to locate a site for the capital on state owned land. The Commission, composed of Governor David Butler, Secretary of State Thomas Kennard, and Auditor John Gillespie, began to tour sites on July 18, 1867 for the new capital city. The village of Lancaster was chosen, in part due to the salt flats and marshes. Lancaster had approximately 30 residents. Disregarding the original plat of the village of Lancaster, Thomas Kennard platted Lincoln on a broader scale. The plat of the village of Lancaster was not dissolved nor abandoned; Lancaster became Lincoln when the Lincoln plat files were finished September 6, 1867. To raise money for the construction of a capital city, a successful auction of lots was held. Newcomers began to arrive and Lincoln's population grew. The Nebraska State Capitol was completed on December 1, 1868; a two-story building constructed with native limestone with a central cupola. The Kennard house, built in 1869, is the oldest remaining building in the original plat of Lincoln.

=== Building of a city ===
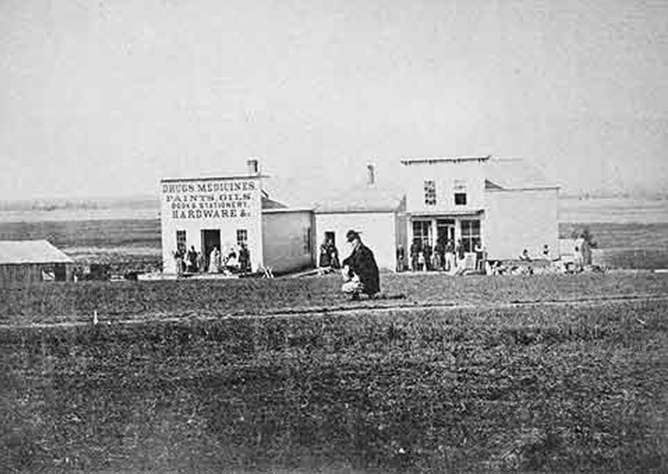
Lincoln, as seen in 1868

In 1867, the first newspaper, the Nebraska Commonwealth, was established by Charles H. Gere. The Commonwealth became the Nebraska State Journal in 1868. By the close of 1868, Lincoln had a population of approximately 500 people. In 1869, the University of Nebraska was established in Lincoln by the state with a land grant of about 130,000 acres. Construction of University Hall, the first building, began the same year. The city of Lincoln was incorporated April 1, 1869.

The Burlington & Missouri River Railroad's first train arrived in Lincoln on June 26, 1870, soon to be followed by the Midland Pacific in 1871 and the Atchison & Nebraska in 1872. The Union Pacific began service in 1877. The Chicago & North Western and Missouri Pacific began service in 1886. The Chicago, Rock Island & Pacific extended service to Lincoln in 1892. Lincoln became a rail center.

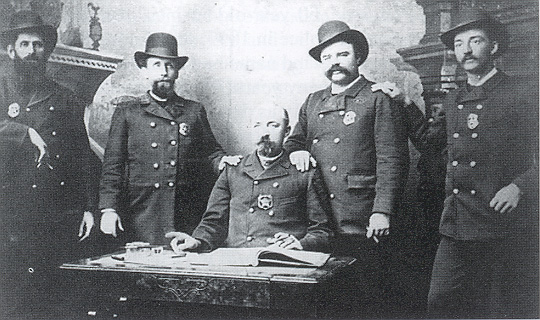
Lincoln Police force in 1885

In 1869, Wyuka Cemetery was established by the state as a state cemetery in the new capital city. The cemetery was modeled after the rural Mount Auburn Cemetery east of Boston. Wyuka is from the Lakota language meaning "to rest". Lakota is spoken by the Lakota people of the Sioux tribes. The first police force was formed July 1870. On December 22, 1870, the State Lunatic Asylum was completed and accepting patients. One year later the asylum burned down. A new asylum was completed in 1872. By 1888, there were nearly 400 patients. The Lincoln Gas Light Company was organized in 1872. The US Post Office and Courthouse was built from 1874–1879. The city public library was founded in December 1875.

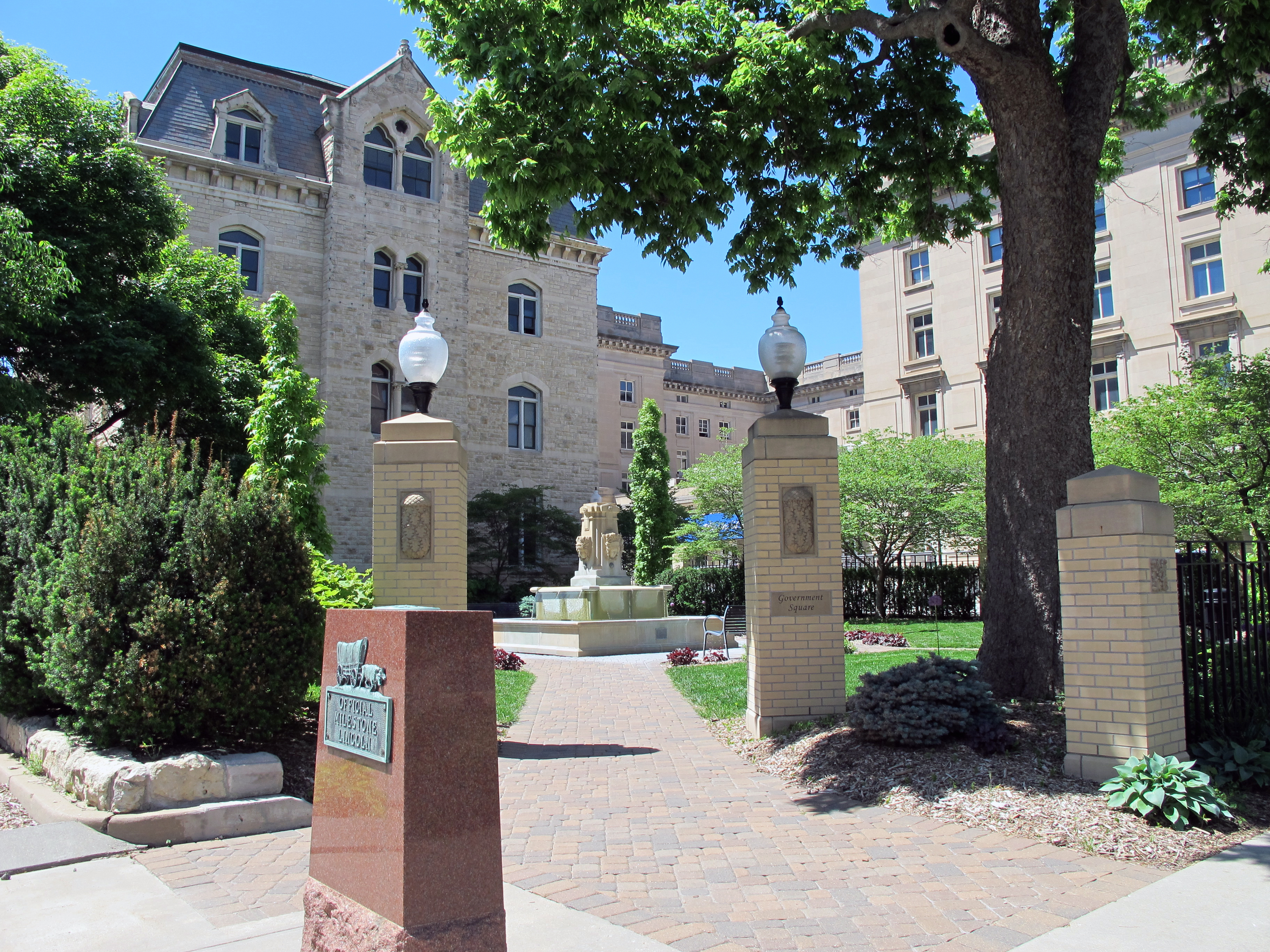
Government Square; U.S. Post Office and Courthouse (1879-1906), City Hall (1906-1969).

As the city grew with new residents, retail flourished. Herpolsheimer's and Miller & Paine were the first department stores in Lincoln, both founded in 1880. Herpolsheimer's first location was at 1109 O Street and operated as the Cash Goods House. A decade later, Herpolsheimer's relocated to the southwest corner of 12th and N Streets, building a 73,000 square foot building. The store was known variously as The Exposition Store, The Glass Block and The Daylight Store. The store was reported at the time to be the largest department store west of the Missouri River. Herpolsheimer's closed in May 1931 due to the Great Depression. Miller & Paine occupied the corner of 13th and O Streets and would continue to be in business until 1988.

In 1880, the Lincoln Telephone Exchange was organized. The City Water Works were begun in 1881. The city council voted to establish a full-time paid Fire Department in 1885 with one company working with volunteer fire companies. By 1886 the volunteer fire companies dispanded. In 1887, the department increased to three companies. The Fire Departments horses, which pulled the hose cart and steamer, were not replaced with gasoline engines until 1919. The first hospital, Saint Elizabeth Hospital, was founded in 1889. Saint Elizabeth Hospital would be the only general hospital in Lincoln until 1922.

In 1888 a new capitol building was constructed on the site of the first capitol. The new building replaced the former structurally unsound capitol. The second capitol building was a classical design, designed by architect William H. Willcox. The worldwide economic depression of 1890 saw the reduction of Lincoln's population from 55,000 to 37,000 by 1900.

== 20th century ==
=== Beginnings of a modern city ===
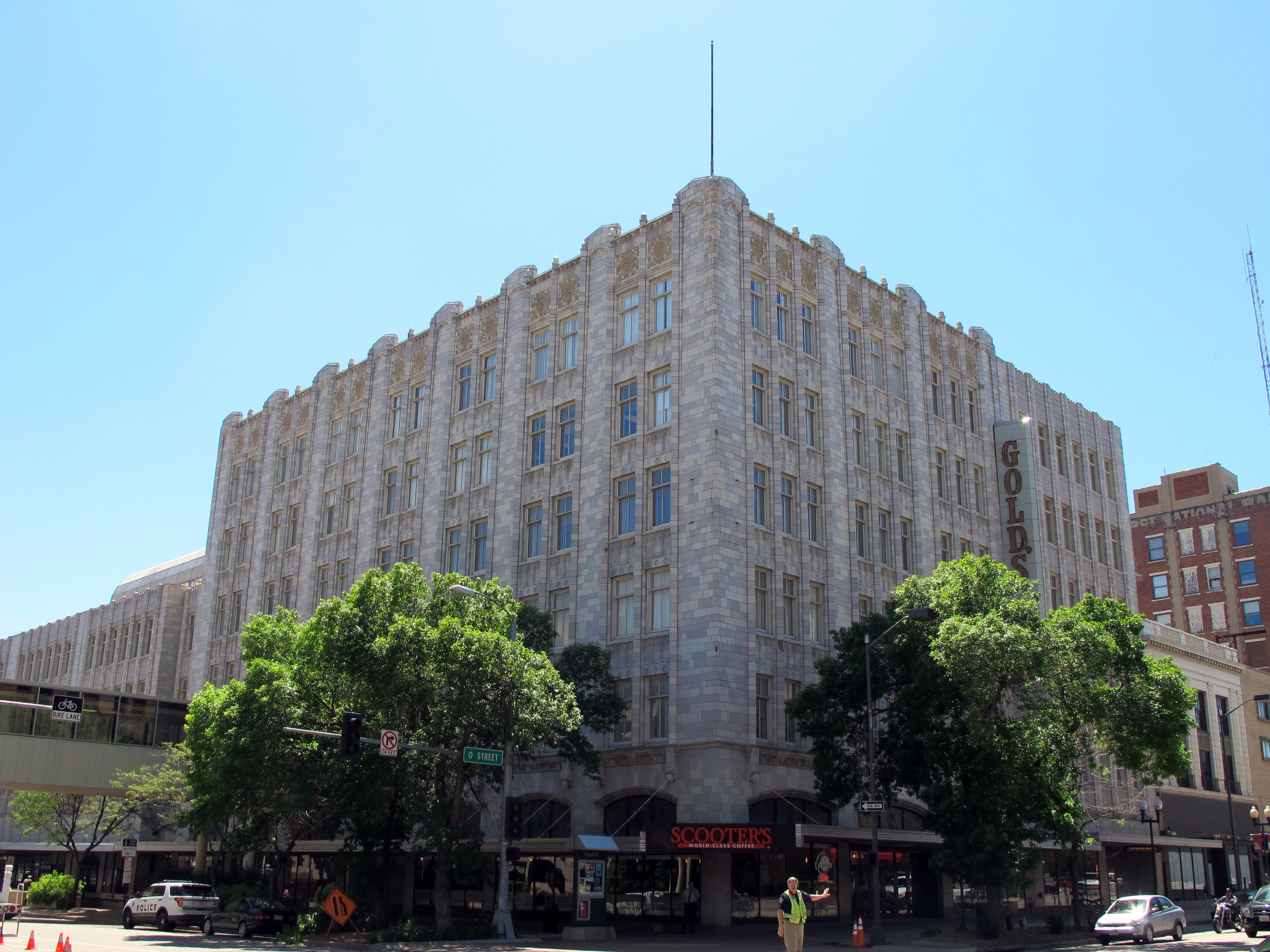
Gold's building

In 1905, the evening newspaper, The Nebraska State Journal, was joined by a morning newspaper, The Lincoln Star. Both newspapers merged in 1995 to become the Lincoln Journal Star. In 1915 William Gold incorporated his former dry goods store The Peoples Store as Gold and Company. Gold and Company would expand at the site of 11th and O Street to become a six-story department store known as Gold's.

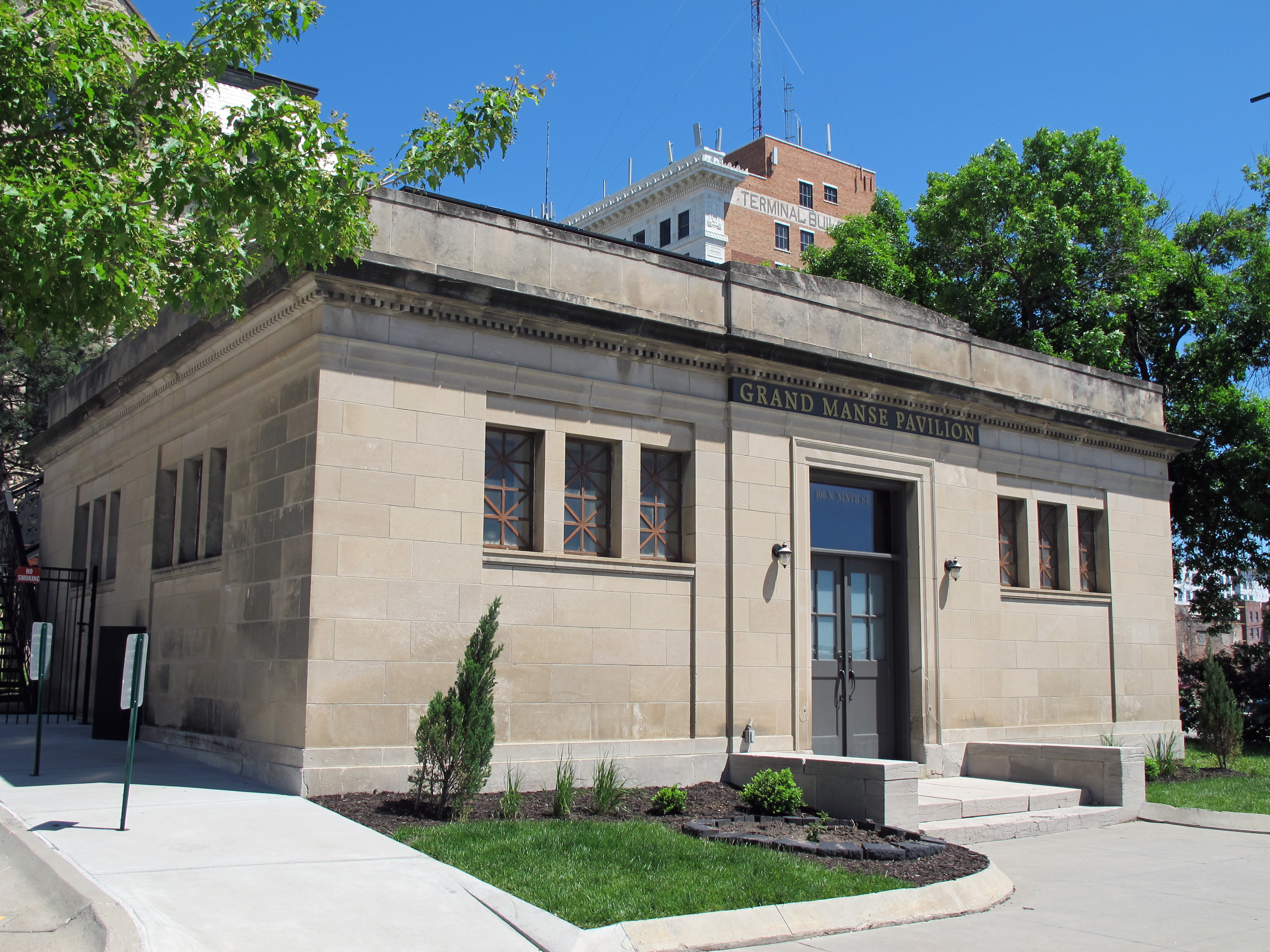
Grand Manse Pavilion formerly the Public Comfort Station for Men building

As automobile travel became more common in the U.S., the needs for better roads in Nebraska and throughout the U.S. grew. After planning and by the Omaha-Denver Trans-Continental Route Association in 1911 with support from the Good Roads Movement, the Omaha-Lincoln-Denver Highway (O-L-D) was established through Lincoln. Its goal was having the most efficient highway to travel on throughout the state of Nebraska, from Omaha to Denver. Construction and improvements existing roads began shortly thereafter and the highway was established. The original O-L-D route through Lincoln approached the city from University Place to the north (Warren Avenue - today's N. 48th Street); then Holdrege St. west past the Agricultural College; N. 27th St. south; O Street west through downtown; N. 3rd St. north one block; then finally P Street west out of Lincoln towards Emerald. Up until 1919, the responsibility for maintenance of the O-L-D was up to the association, individuals and towns along the route, including Lincoln. After 1919, with a series of acts, the O-L-D was transferred to the state highway system, who took over upkeep of the highway.

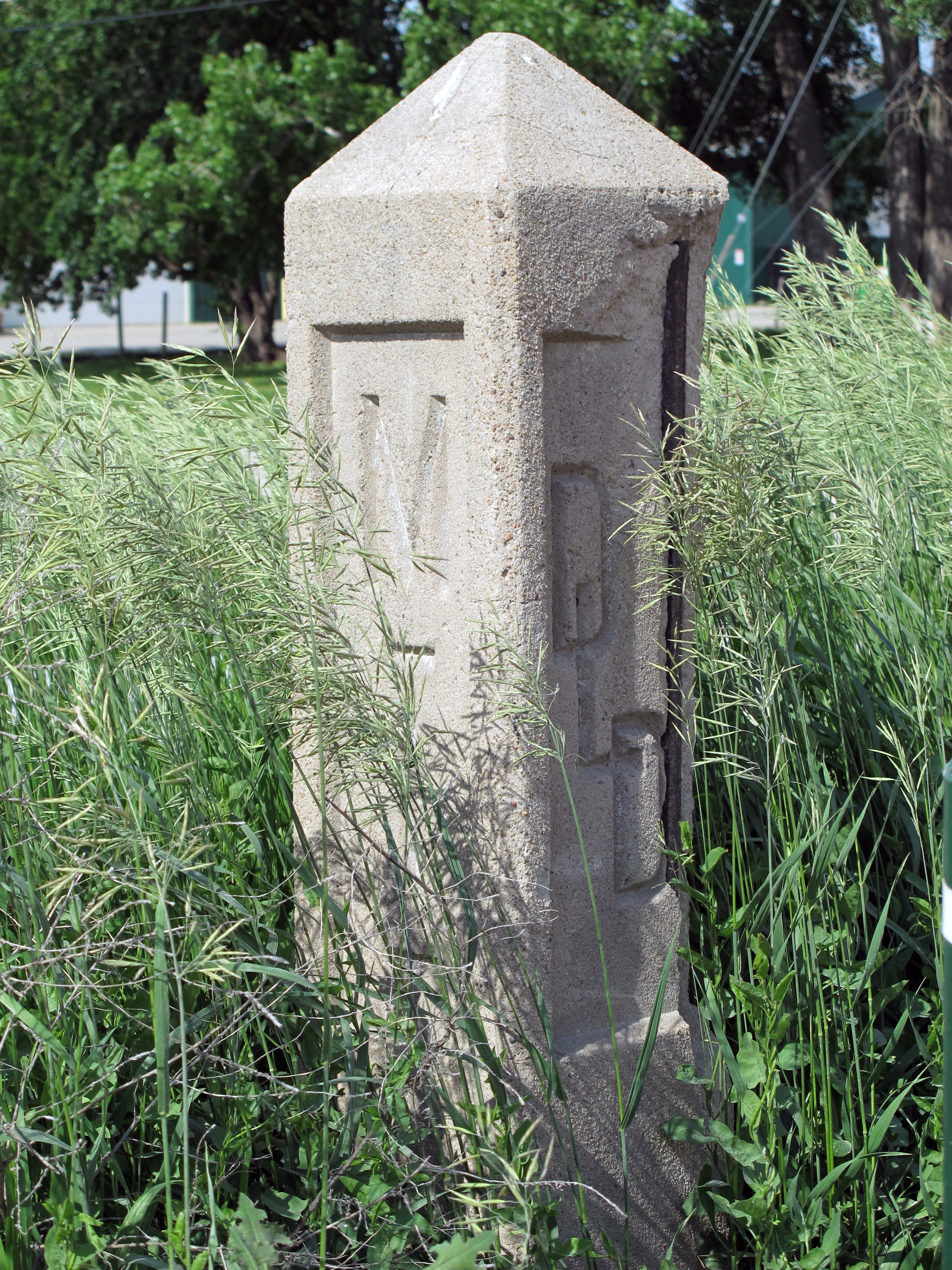
Detroit-Lincoln-Denver (D-L-D) Highway monument

In 1920, the Omaha-Denver Association merged with Detroit-Lincoln-Denver Highway Association. As a result, the O-L-D was renamed the Detroit-Lincoln-Denver Highway (D-L-D) with the goal of having a continuous highway from Detroit to Denver. The goal was eventually realized by the mid 1920s; 1,700 mi (2,700 km) of constantly improved highway through six states. The autoroute was a tourist magnet and traffic was heavy. Businesses were built and facilities were established in towns along the route in order to keep up with traveler demand. In Lincoln, the Lincoln Automobile Club Tourist Camp at S. 24th and Randolph Streets was advertised as having modern amenities for any road traveler, including enough room for 400 cars and tents with shade, hot showers, electric stoves, electric lights, gravel roads, etc. At 9th and O Streets, a Public Comfort Station for Men was constructed as a rest stop for gentlemen only, featuring Bedford stone, glazed tile and plumbing. The station building, no longer a rest stop, is the Grand Manse Pavilion.

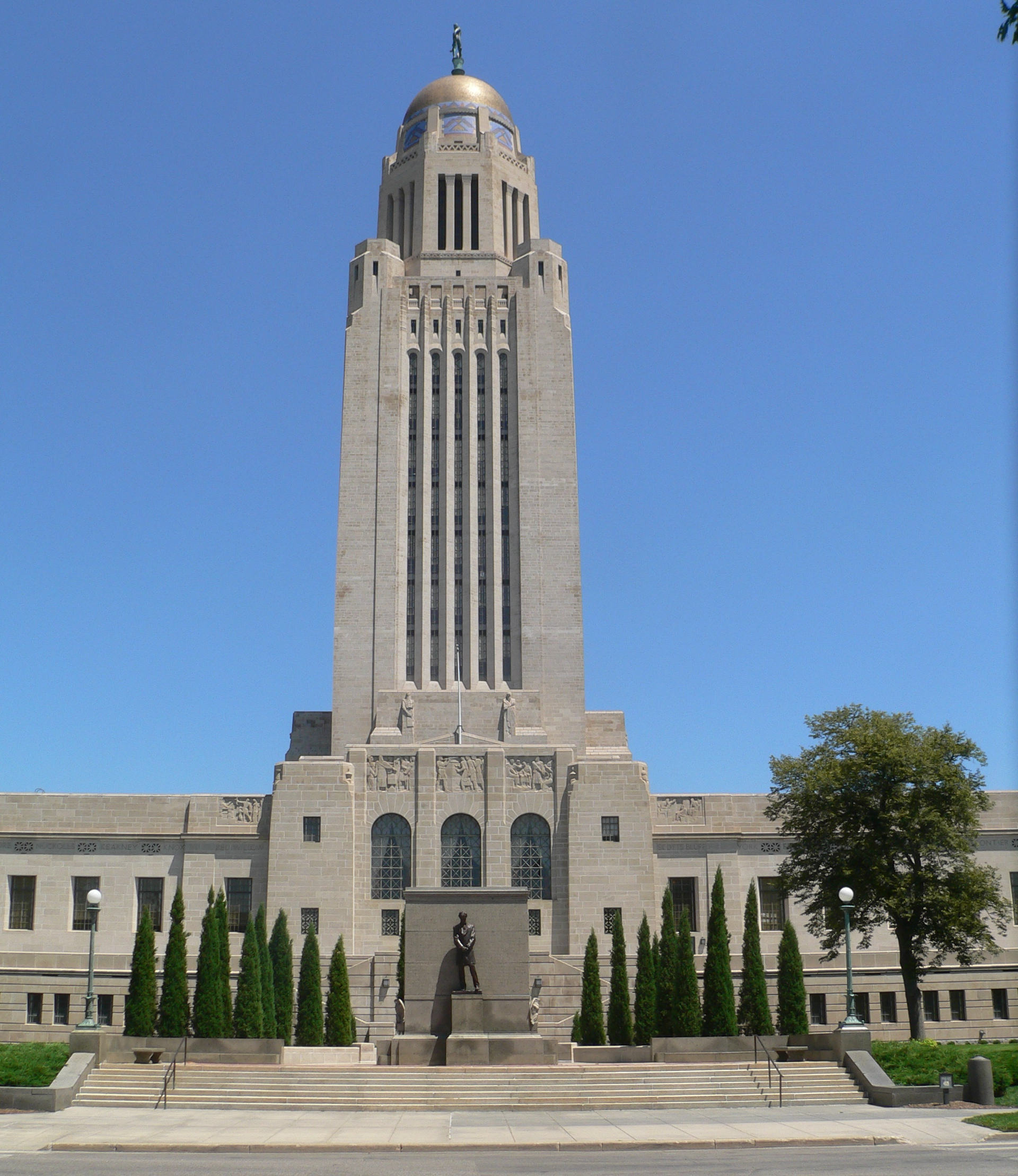
Goodhue-designed Nebraska State Capitol

In the early decades of the twentieth century, Volga-German immigrants from Russia settled in the North Bottoms neighborhood. As Lincoln expanded with the growth in population, the city began to annex towns nearby. The first town annexed was Bethany Heights in 1922. The former city was incorporated in 1890.

Construction began on a third capitol building in 1922. The Willcox designed capitol's foundation settled and the building was structurally unsound. Bertram G. Goodhue was selected in a national competition as its architect. By 1924, the first phase of construction was completed and state offices moved into the new building. In 1925, the Willcox designed capitol building was razed. The Goodhue designed capitol was constructed in four phases, with the completion of the fourth phase in 1932 (total completion of the Goodhue design would not be realized until the completion of the capitol fountains within the four interior courtyards of the capitol building, with an estimated completion date of 2017).

In 1922, former United States Secretary of State William Jennings Bryan donated his home and land to create Bryan Memorial Hospital. The city raised money by a bond issue and opened Lincoln General Hospital in 1925.

In 1929, the city annexed the town College View. College View was incorporated in 1892. Union College, a Seventh Day Adventist institution, was founded in College View in 1891.

=== Growth and expansion ===
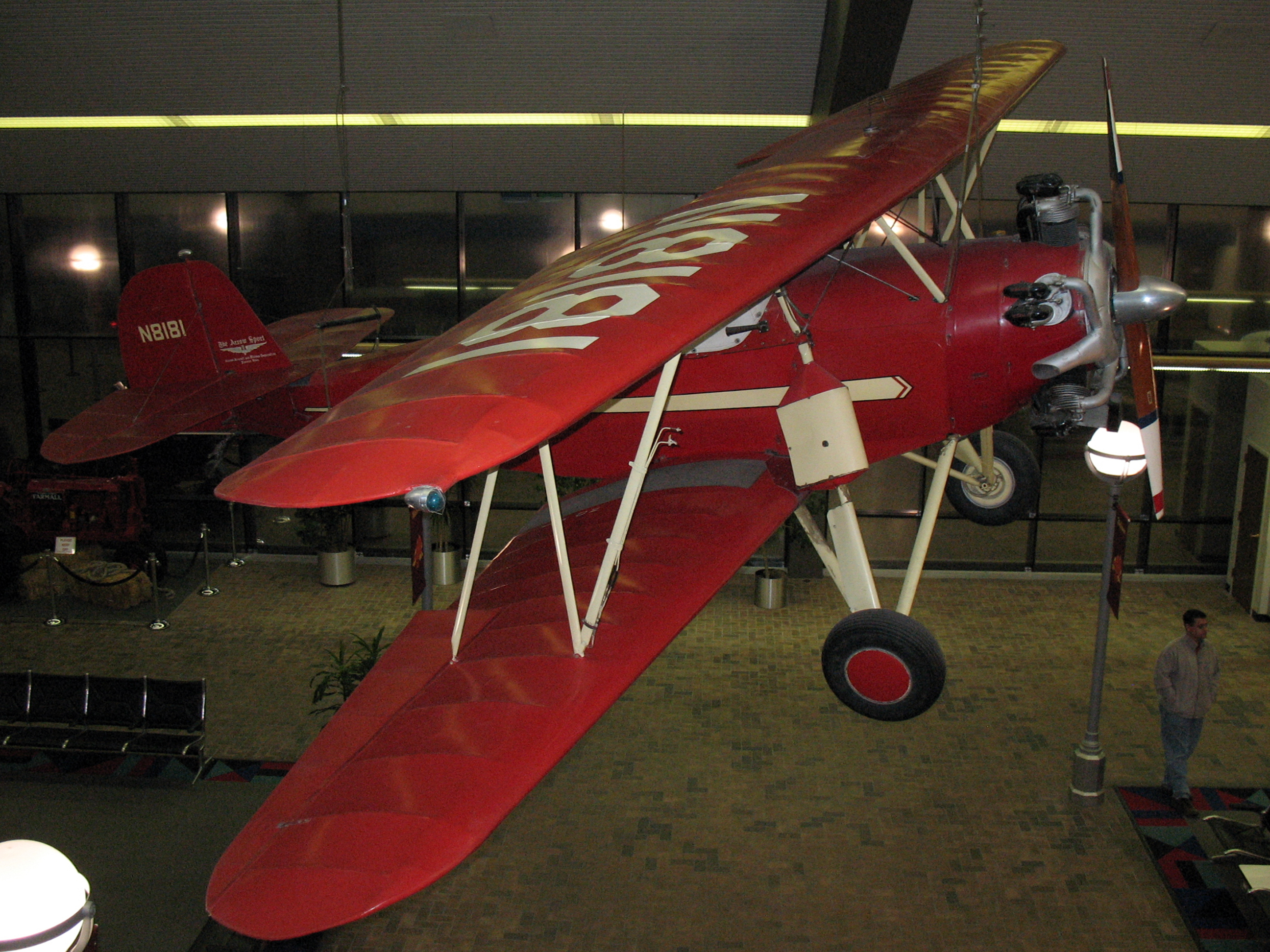
Arrow Sport, Lincoln Airport.

In the early years of air travel, Lincoln had three airports and one airfield. One, Union Airport, was established northeast of Lincoln in 1920 by E.J. Sias. Charles Lindbergh learned to fly at the Lincoln Flying School April 1, 1922. The Lincoln Flying School was founded by E.J. Sias in a building he built at 2145 O Street. The flying school closed in 1947. Some remnants of the old airport can still be seen today in-between N. 56th and N. 70th Streets, north of Fletcher Avenue; mangled within a slowly developing industrial zone.

In 1924, the D-L-D was officially designated as Nebraska State Highway 6 and by 1926, the Detroit-Lincoln-Denver name all but disappeared. Also in 1926, the highway became part of the Federal Highway System and was renumbered U.S. Route 38.

Arrow Airport was established around 1925 as a manufacturing and test facility for Arrow Aircraft and Motors Corporation, primarily the Arrow Sport. The airfield was located near Havelock; or to the west of where the North 48th Street Small Vehicle Transfer Station is located today. Arrow Aircraft & Motors declared bankruptcy in 1939 and Arrow Airport closed roughly several decades later. An existing Arrow Sport can be seen on permanent display, hanging in the Lincoln Airport's main passenger terminal.

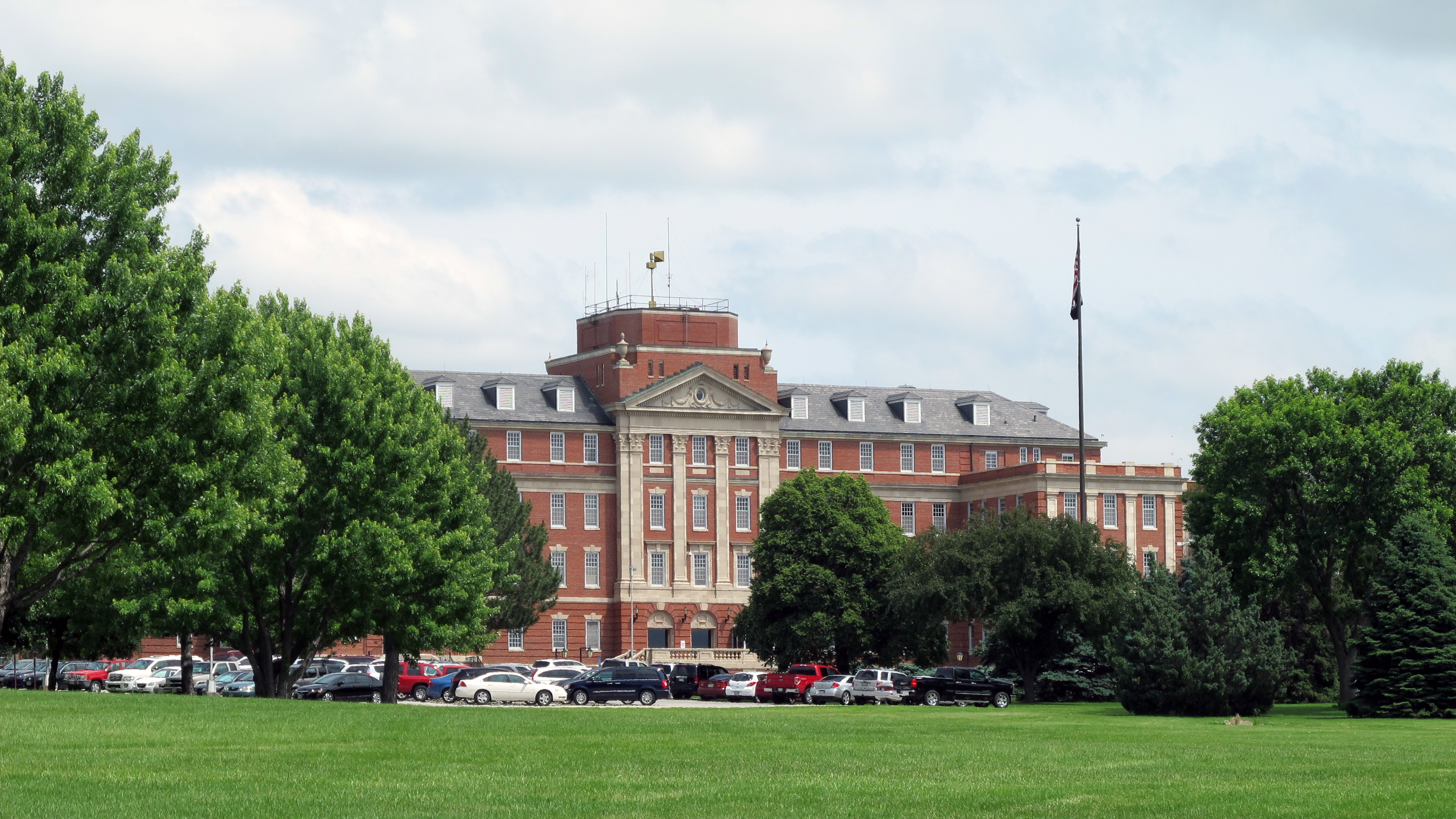
Veterans Administration Nebraska-Western Iowa Health Care System

The city's small municipal airfield in 1930 was dedicated to Charles Lindbergh and named Lindbergh Field for a short period of time as another airfield was named Lindbergh in California. The airfield was north of Salt Lake, in an area known variously over the years as Huskerville, Arnold Heights and Air Park; and was located approximately within the western half of the West Lincoln Township. The air field was a stop for United Airlines in 1927 and a mail stop in 1928.

In 1930, the Veterans' Hospital was opened east of the city and the city annexed the town of Havelock. Havelock actively opposed annexation to Lincoln and only relented due to a strike by the Burlington railroad shop workers which halted progress & growth for the city. By 1930, the population of Lincoln had grown to 75,933.

In 1931, Nebraska State Highway 6 was renumbered as U.S. 6/U.S. 38 overlap and in 1933, the U.S. 38 route designation was dropped. On June 30, 1937, Congress designated U.S. 6 as a national route honoring the Grand Army of the Republic. Since then, U.S. 6 has been also known as the Grand Army of the Republic Highway and at one time was the longest national route in the U.S. In Lincoln, what began as the O-L-D has taken various routes throughout the city throughout time. Some old D-L-D route designation monuments can still be found inside and outside the city, a reminder of where the old highway once ran. One such is at the corner of N. 2nd and P Streets; another near Emerald.

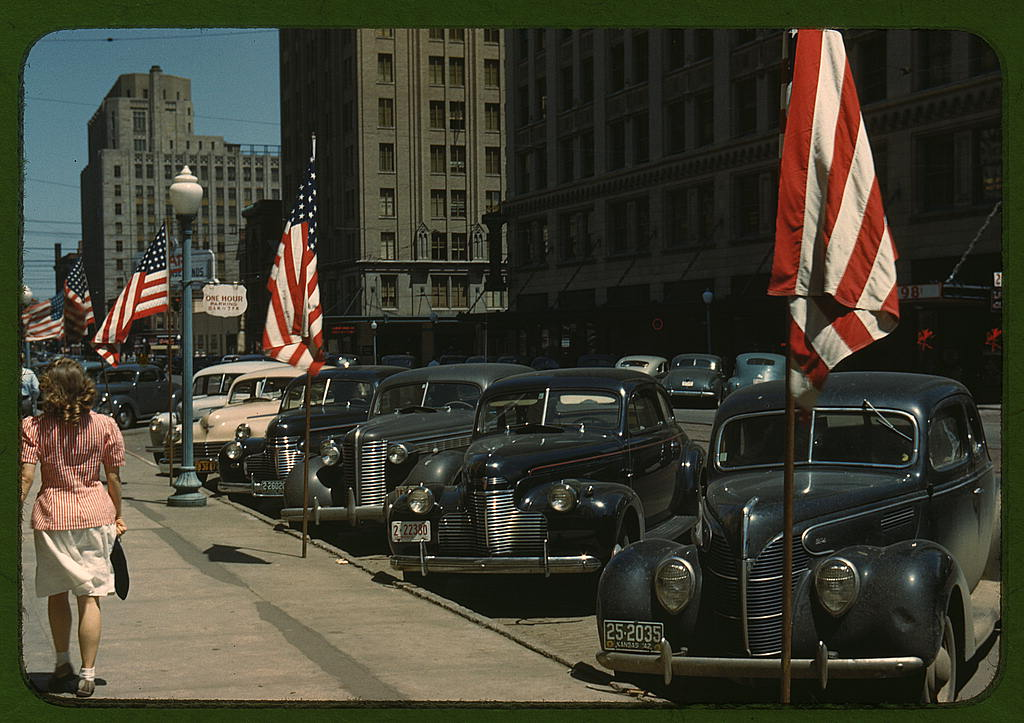
S. 13th Street at alleyway south of "N" St., looking north in 1942

The Lincoln Army Airfield was established in 1942 at the site. During World War II, over 25,000 aviation mechanics were trained with over 40,000 troopers being processed for combat. The Army closed the base in 1945. The Air Force reactivated the base during the Korean War in 1952. In 1966, the base was closed and Lincoln annexed the airfield, including the base's old housing units to the west. The base became the Lincoln Municipal Airport under ownership of the Lincoln Airport Authority. Around the turn of the 21st century, the airport was renamed the Lincoln Airport. The authority shared facilities with the Nebraska National Guard, who continued ownership over some portions of the old Air Force base. During the 1960s, the two main airlines serving the Lincoln Airport were United Airlines and the original Frontier Airlines.

In 1956, Bankers Life Insurance Company of Nebraska announced plans to build a $6 million shopping center next to their new campus on the east-side outskirts of Lincoln. Gateway Mall was completed and open for business at 60th and O streets in 1960. The open-air mall was originally anchored by Montgomery Wards and Miller & Paine; its second location in the city. Early tenants included S. S. Kresge, Walgreens, Ben Simons and Gateway Bank. Later tenants included Hovland-Swanson and Hinky Dinky.

=== Revitalization ===
The downtown core retail district from 1959 to 1984 saw profound changes as retail shopping moved from downtown to the Gateway Shopping Mall. By 1984, 75% of Lincoln's revenue from retail sales tax came from within a one-mile radius of the Mall. The opening of multiple screen movie theaters east of downtown saw the older movie palaces renovated beyond recognition and other movie theaters close. The Stuart Theater, which co-hosted the premier of the movie Cheers for Miss Bishop in 1941, was renovated beyond recognition with the balconies either removed or covered, chandeliers removed, ceilings lowered and the stage converted into a bar.

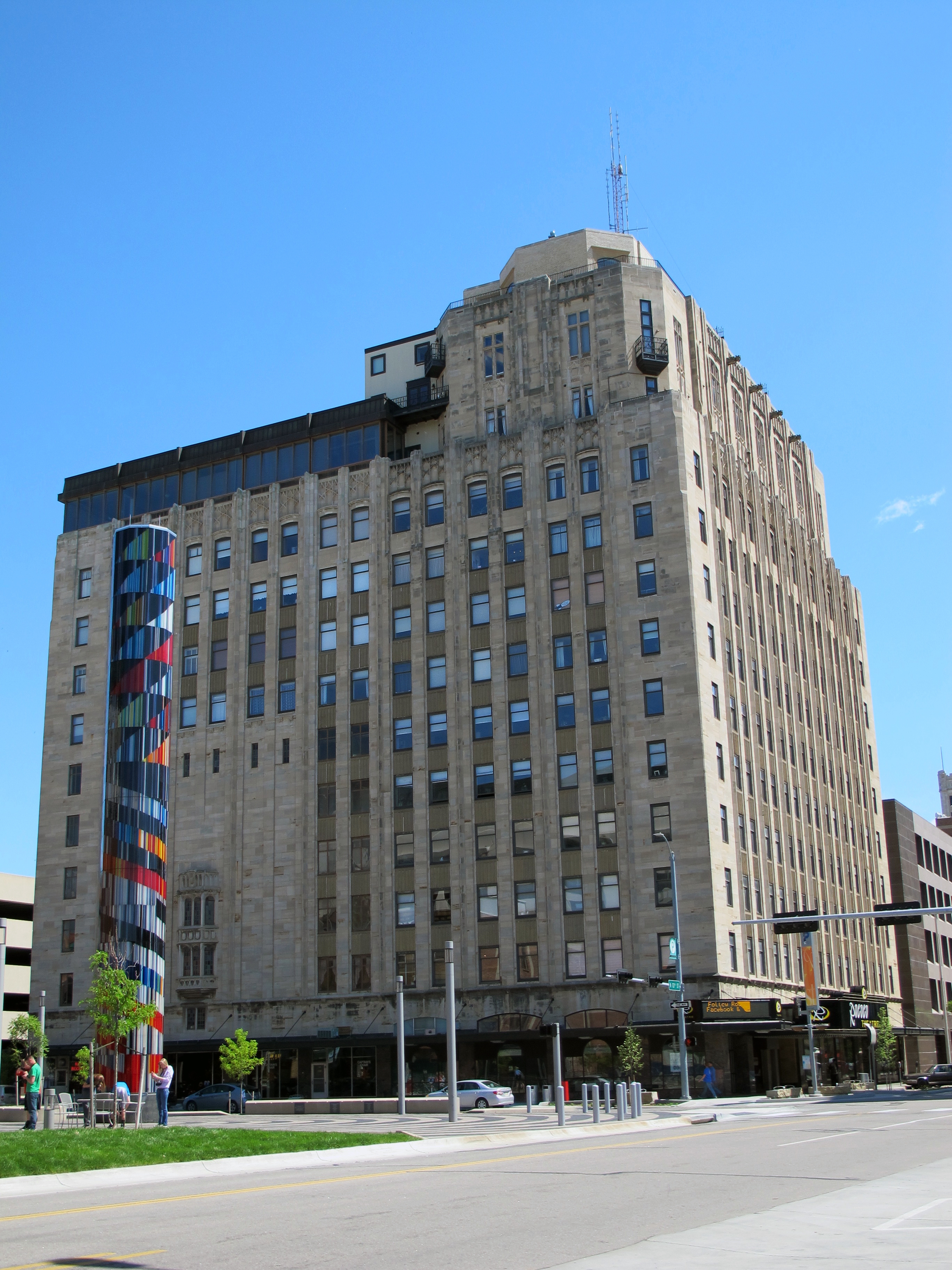
Stuart Building

One of the first segments of Interstate 80 completed in Nebraska linked Lincoln to Omaha in 1961 and was largely open to traffic in 1962. Around the time, Lincoln had only four interchanges: Waverly (U.S. 6), U.S. 77, Interstate 180 and West Lincoln (U.S. 34/Nebraska 2). Speed limit during the early days of I-80 in Nebraska was 75 mph (120 km/h).

In 1964, Gold's department store merged with Omaha-based department store Brandeis. A short time later, the Gold's name ceased to be used and the downtown department store was renamed Brandeis. Miller & Paine and Brandeis became downtown destination shopping centers with their own parking garages. Though the department stores continued to operate, foot traffic in downtown decreased. Restaurants and other service businesses either closed or moved outside of the downtown core business district. With the exodus of retail and service businesses, the downtown core began to decline and deteriorate.

The Nebraska legislature in 1969 legislated laws for urban renewal and shortly after Lincoln began a program of revitalization and beautification of the city. Most of the urban renewal projects focused on downtown and the Near South areas. Beautification included new street lighting Many ideas were considered and not implemented. Successes included Sheldon Memorial Art Gallery designed by Philip Johnson, new branch libraries, the First National Bank and the National Bank of Commerce designed by I.M. Pei.

In 1971, an expansion of Gateway Mall was completed. The expansion included a new second story indoor mall corridor connecting the outlying Sears to the mall with covered parking underneath the corridor. Another major expansion of the Gateway Mall occurred in 1977. Brandeis opened a new store in the outdoor portion of the mall adjacent to Miller & Paine. Brandeis closed the former Gold's downtown store in 1980. In 1985 Bankers Life sold the Gateway Mall to Jacobs Visconsi Jacobs of Cleveland. Brandeis was bought by Younkers in 1987 and shortly thereafter the former Brandeis store was renamed Younkers. Miller & Paine was purchased by the department store chain Dillard's in 1988. Miller & Paine's flagship downtown store closed shortly after the purchase and the Gateway Mall location was renamed Dillard's.

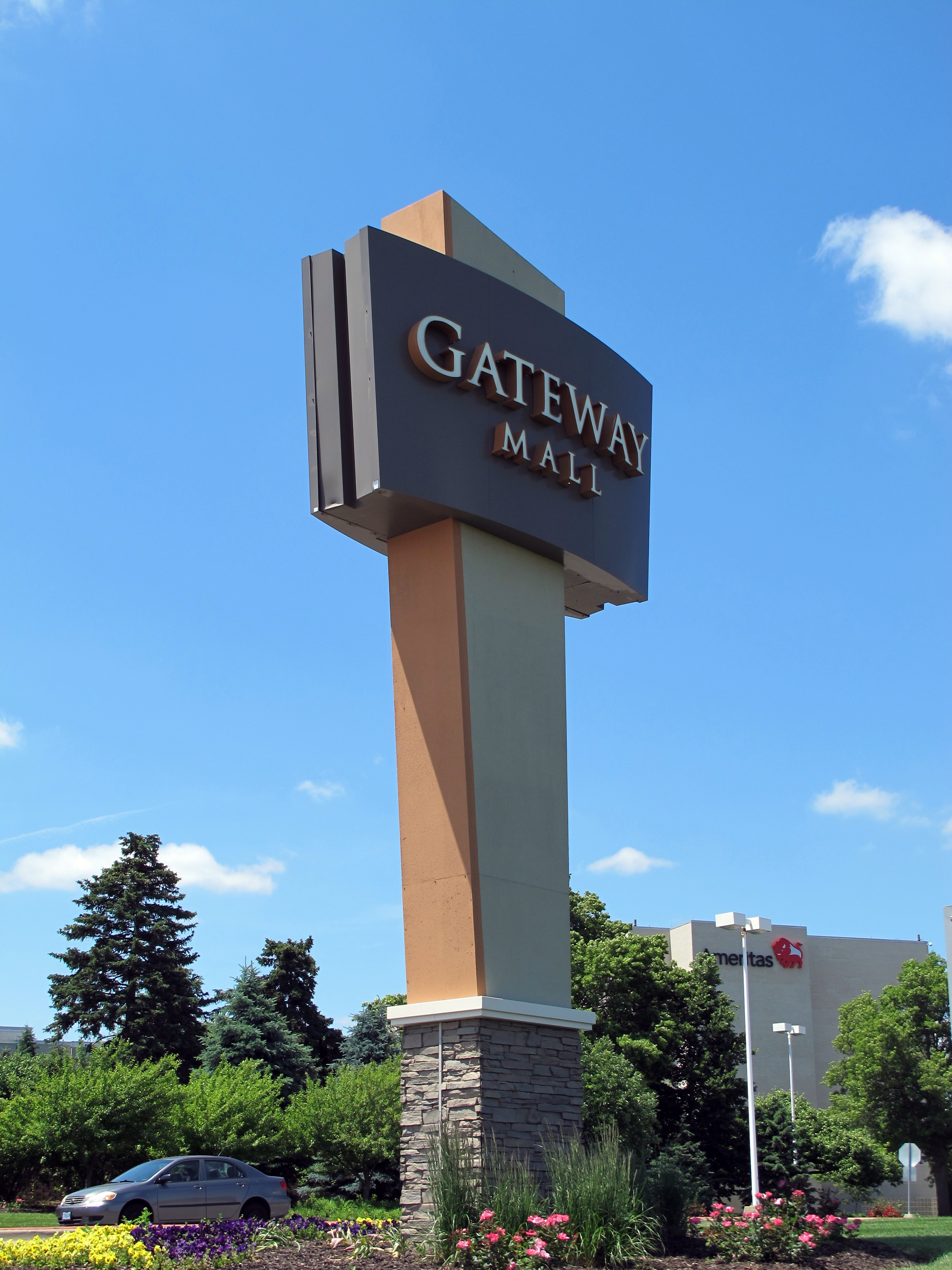
Gateway Mall

Mayor Helen Boosalis, Lincoln's first woman mayor was elected in 1975. Mayor Boosalis was a strong supporter of the revitalization of Lincoln with the downtown beautification project being completed in 1978. In 1979, the square-block downtown Centrum was opened and connected to buildings with a skywalk. The Centrum was a two-level shopping mall with a garage for 1,038 cars. With the beautification and urban renewal projects many historic buildings were razed in the city.

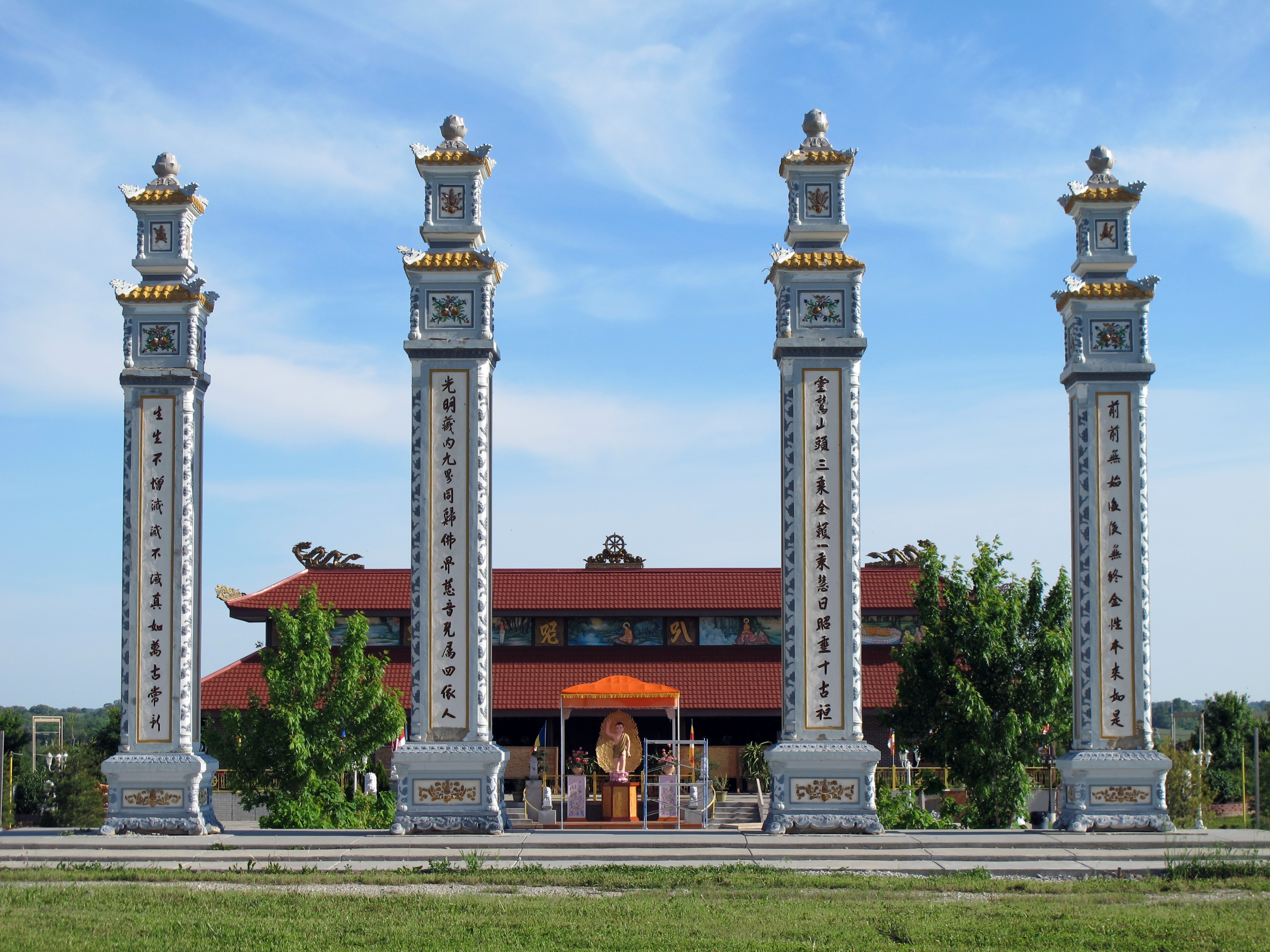
Linh Quang Buddhist Center

Vietnamese refugees, from the fall of Saigon in 1975, established a significant ethnic community with businesses along the 27th Street corridor alongside Mexican eateries and African markets. Lincoln was designated as a "Refugee Friendly" city by the U.S. Department of State in the 1970s. In 2000, Lincoln was the 12th largest resettlement site per capita in the country.

The decade from 1990 to 2000 saw population growth never seen before. North 27th Street and Cornhusker Highway were redeveloped with new housing and businesses built. The booming housing market in south Lincoln created new housing developments including high end housing in areas like Cripple Creek, Willamsburg, and The Ridge. The shopping center Southpointe Pavilions was completed in competition of Gateway Mall.

In 1995, the original open-air portion of Gateway Mall was enclosed and expanded. An indoor mall corridor was built connecting a new J.C. Penney store to the existing 1971 enclosed corridor. The previous location of J.C. Penney was temporarily inside a former Hinky Dinky grocery store building in a complex of Gateway Mall stores north of the main mall. The former J.C. Penney building was expanded with Circuit City occupying the building until its closure in 2008.

== 21st century ==
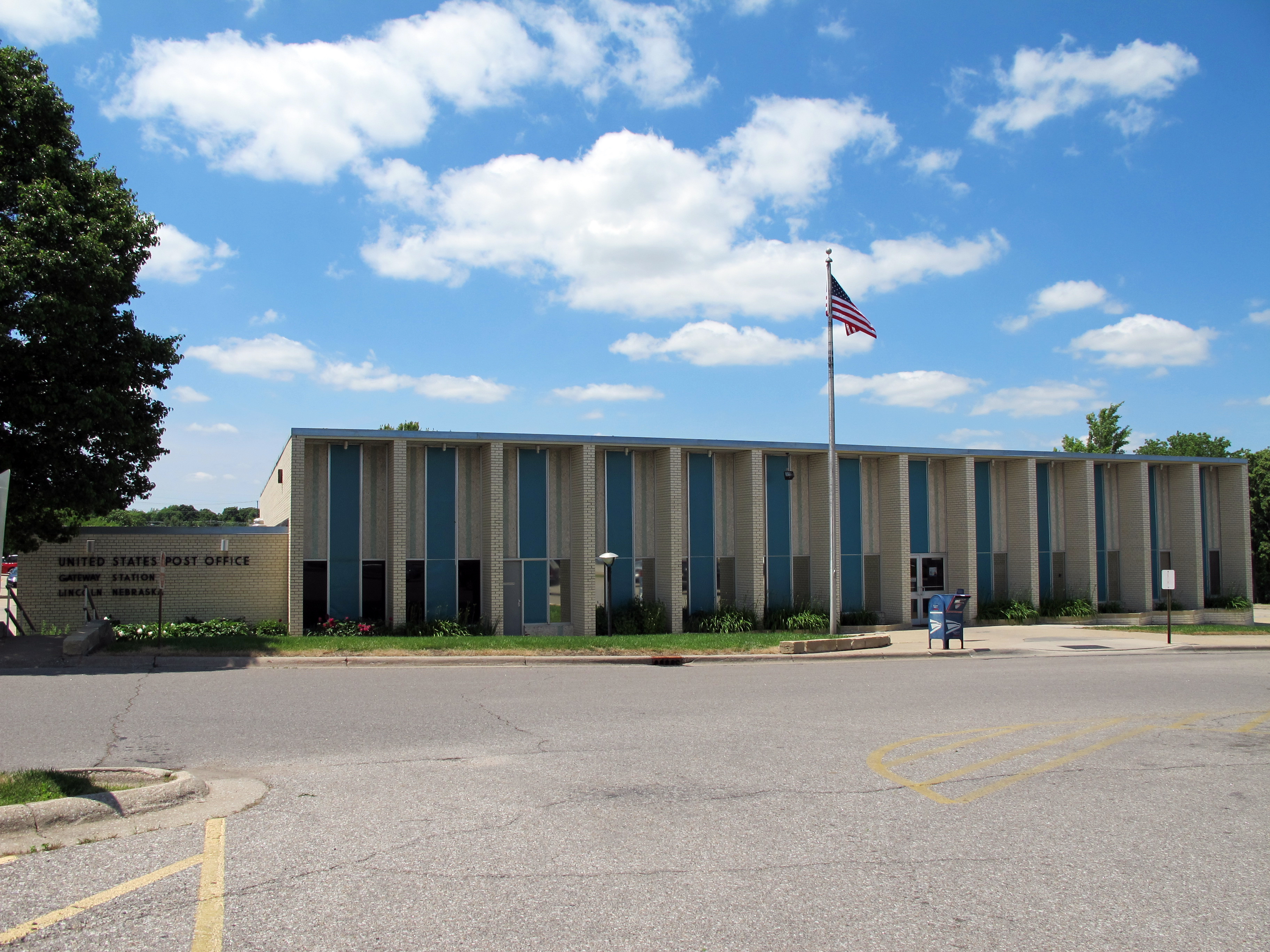
Gateway Post Office

Shortly after the dot-com bubble burst in 2000, Montgomery Wards closed all stores nationwide, including the 110,000-square-foot anchor store in Gateway Mall. In 2001, Gateway Mall was purchased by Westfield America Trust. Westfield renamed the mall Westfield Shoppingtown Gateway; then in 2005, Westfield Gateway. Westfield made a $45 million makeover of the mall in 2005 including an expanded food court, a new west-side entrance and installation of an Italian carousel.

In 2007 and 2009, the city of Lincoln received beautification grants for improvements on O and West O Streets, west of the Harris Overpass, commemorating the history of the D-L-D.

In 2012, Westfield America Trust sold Westfield Gateway to Starwood Capital Group. Starwood reverted the mall's name from Westfield Gateway to Gateway Mall. Since 2012, Starwood Capital Group has made incremental expansions and renovations. In 2014, the U.S. Postal Service, with its lease up and plans to downsize, announced plans to move the Gateway U.S. Post Office to a different location. In 2016, the Post Office, having been located in the mall since 1968, was relocated across from the mall near the intersection of N 66th St and Q Street. Gateway Mall is the largest mall in the city of Lincoln.

In 2015, rain caused Salt Creek to exceed capacity on the west side of the city. North and South Bottoms neighborhoods were asked to volunteerly evacuate. Antelope Valley project forced water to stay within the Antelope Valley Creek. The Lincoln Municipal Airport Reported 6.65 inches of rain.

In 2015, ALLO Communications was purchased by Nelnet (headquartered in Lincoln); a day later, it was announced that ALLO would bring ultra-high speed fiber internet to the city. Speeds up to 1 Gigabit per second were planned for both business and household use by using the city's existing fiber network. Construction on the citywide network was to begin in March 2016 and was estimated to be complete by 2019. Telephone and cable TV service would also be included, making it the third company to compete for such services within Lincoln. Almost a month after ALLO's announcement of Gigabit internet, Windstream Communications announced that 1 Gigabit internet would come to the city, using its existing fiber network. Installation was to begin in 2016, although it was not initially clear how many homes or businesses would have access.

In 2023, a revitalization project demolished the southern portion of the Gold's Building downtown in order to facilitate the construction of a Hampton Inn hotel, which will occupy the northern portion of the building. According to the Lincoln Journal Star, the southern portion of the building would have been too expensive to redevelop. The northern portion will also be converted into mixed-use spaces.

== Panoramas ==
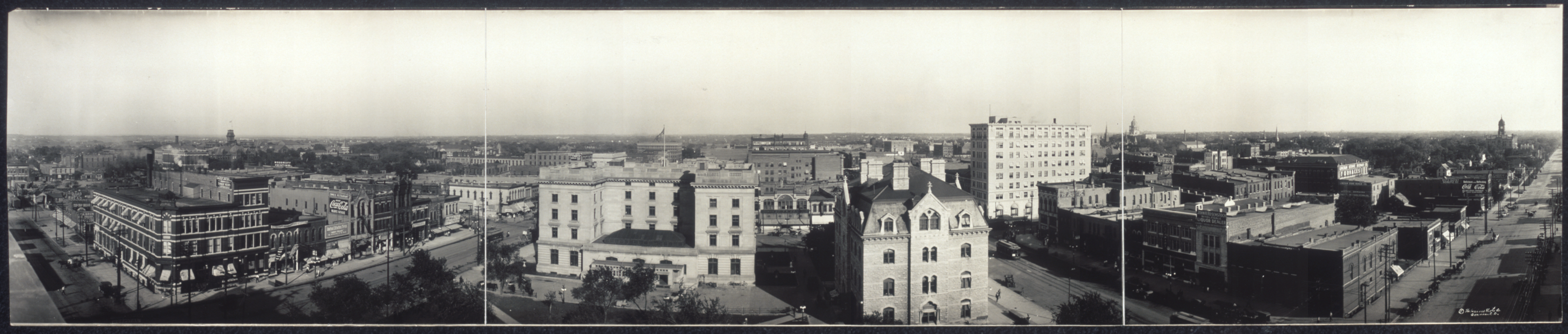
Lincoln (1915), center of panorama is Government Square; U.S. Post Office and Courthouse (1879-1906), City Hall (1906-1969).
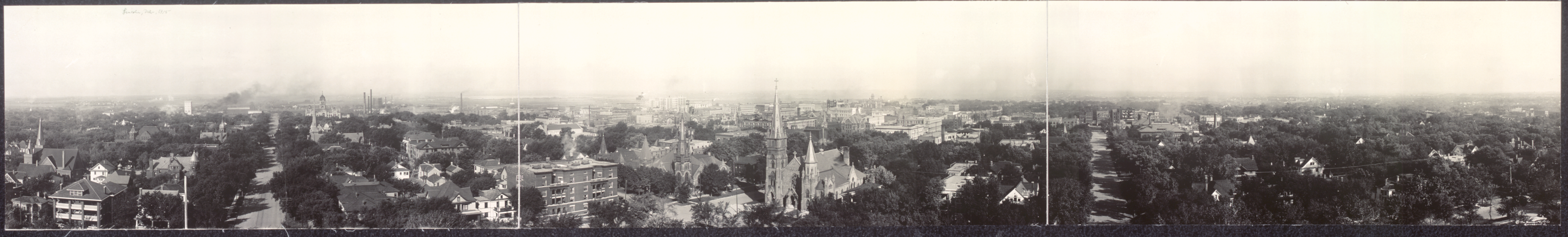
Lincoln (1915)

== See also ==
- Gilded Age Plains City: The Great Sheedy Murder Trial and the Booster Ethos of Lincoln, Nebraska
- History of Nebraska
- Lincoln, Nebraska
- List of people from Lincoln, Nebraska
- List of mayors of Lincoln, Nebraska
- National Register of Historic Places listings in Lancaster County, Nebraska
- Timeline of Lincoln, Nebraska history
