= Timeline of Lincoln, Nebraska history =

Events from 1856 to the present

The following is a timeline of Lincoln, Nebraska history including significant social, political, cultural, and economic events in the history of Lincoln.

== 1856–1868 ==
- Early 19th century Plains Indians, descendants of indigenous peoples who occupy the area for thousands of years, live and hunt along Salt Creek. The Pawnee, which include four tribes, live in villages along the Platte River. The Great Sioux Nation, including the Ihanktowan-Ihanktowana and the Lakota located to the north and west, use Nebraska as a hunting and skirmish ground.
- 1856
  - Village of Lancaster founded.
  - Captain W. T. Donovan, a former steamer captain, and his family settle on Salt Creek
- 1858 Captain Donovan and his family abandon the schemes of the Crescent Company and leave the area to the Stevens Creek settlement due to the threatening aspect of the Pawnee Indians.
- 1859 Lancaster becomes the county seat of Lancaster County.
- 1862 Passage of the Homestead Act, homesteaders begin to inhabit the area.
- 1864
  - The first plat for Lancaster laid out.
  - In September, most settlers abandoned Lancaster due to the 1864 Sioux Indian scare.
- 1867
  - Nebraska granted statehood.
  - Formation of Capital Commission to locate a site for the State Capital on State owned land.
  - Commission, composed of Governor David Butler, Secretary of State Thomas Kennard, and Auditor John Gillespie, tour sites for the State Capital. Village of Lancaster chosen.
  - Disregarding the original plat of the village of Lancaster, Thomas Kennard plats Lincoln on a broader scale. Village of Lancaster not dissolved nor abandoned, however Lancaster becomes Lincoln when the Lincoln plat is filed on September 6.
  - First newspaper, The Nebraska Commonwealth established by Charles H. Gere.
- 1868
  - December 1, Nebraska State Capitol completed.
  - The Commonwealth newspaper becomes the Nebraska State Journal.
  - Population approximately 500.

== 1869–1899 ==
- 1869
  - April 1, Lincoln incorporated.
  - Kennard house built.
  - University of Nebraska established by the State with a land grant of about 130,000 acres.
  - Wyuka Cemetery established by the State as a State cemetery.
  - Nebraska State Penitentiary opens.
- 1870
  - June 6, Burlington and Missouri River Railroad's first train arrives in Lincoln.
  - July, Police force formed.
  - December 22, State Lunatic Asylum completed and accepting patients.
- 1871
  - Midland Pacific Railway begins service.
  - State Lunatic Asylum burns down.
  - Lincoln High School established.
  - University of Nebraska State Museum, also known as Elephant Hall, a natural history museum in the Morrill Hall building on the University of Nebraska campus, founded.
- 1872
  - New State Lunatic Asylum completed.
  - Atchison and Nebraska Railroad begins service.
  - Lincoln Gas Light Company organized.
- 1874-1879 US Post Office and Courthouse built.
- 1875 December, public library founded.
- 1877 Union Pacific railroad begins service.
- 1880
  - Herpolsheimer's and Miller & Paine department stores founded.
  - Lincoln Telephone Exchange organized.
- 1881 City Water Works begin.
- 1885 City council votes to establish a full-time paid Fire Department.
- 1886
  - Volunteer fire companies disband.
  - Chicago & North Western railroad and Missouri Pacific Railroad begin service.
- 1887 Fire department increases to three companies.
- 1888 New capitol building designed by architect William H. Willcox is constructed on the site of the old first capitol.
- 1889 First hospital Saint Elizabeth Hospital founded.
- 1892 Chicago, Rock Island and Pacific Railroad extend service to Lincoln. Lincoln becomes a rail center.
- 1893 First use of "Cornhuskers" to describe University of Nebraska athletic teams. It was officially adopted in 1900 and is often abbreviated to "Huskers."
- 1894 August 9, Rock Island railroad wreck.

== 1900–1960 ==
- Early 20th century Volga-German immigrants from Russia settle in the North Bottoms neighborhood.
- 1900 Worldwide economic depression of 1890. Population decreases from 55,000 to 37,000.
- 1901 Nebraska Legislature names Lancaster County Fairgrounds in Lincoln as the official home of the Nebraska State Fair.
- 1905 Evening newspaper, Nebraska State Journal, joined by morning newspaper, Lincoln Star.
- 1911 Omaha-Denver Trans-Continental Route Association in with support from the Good Roads Movement, Omaha-Lincoln-Denver Highway (O-L-D) established through Lincoln.
- 1915 William Gold incorporates his former dry goods store The Peoples Store as Gold and Company.
- 1916
  - Terminal Building completed.
  - Scottish Rite Temple completed.
- 1919 O-L-D highway transferred to the State highway system.
- 1920
  - Omaha-Denver Association merges with Detroit-Lincoln-Denver Highway Association. O-L-D renamed Detroit-Lincoln-Denver Highway (D-L-D) with the goal of having a continuous highway from Detroit to Denver.
  - Union Airport, established northeast of Lincoln by E.J. Sias.
- 1922
  - Bethany Heights annexed. Former city incorporated in 1890.
  - Construction begins on a third capitol building. Bertram G. Goodhue selected in a national competition as its architect.
  - Former United States Secretary of State William Jennings Bryan donates his home and land to create Bryan Memorial Hospital.
  - April 1, Charles Lindbergh learns to fly at the Lincoln Flying School. The flying school was founded by E.J. Sias in a building he built at 2145 O Street.
- 1924
  - First phase of construction completed on capitol building. State offices move in.
  - D-L-D officially designated as Nebraska State Highway 6.
- 1925
  - Willcox designed capitol building razed.
  - City hospital Lincoln General Hospital opens.
  - Arrow Airport established as a manufacturing and test facility for Arrow Aircraft and Motors Corporation, primarily for the manufacture of the Arrow Sport.
- 1926
  - Nebraska State Highway 6 becomes part of the Federal Highway System and renumbered U.S. Route 38.
  - Town of University Place annexed.
- 1927 United Airlines begins flights to city's air field.
- 1928 City's air field a mail stop.
- 1929 City annexes the town College View. College View incorporated in 1892. Union College, a Seventh Day Adventist institution, was founded in College View in 1891.
- 1930
  - The city's small municipal airfield dedicated to Charles Lindbergh and named Lindbergh Field for a short period of time as another airfield was named Lindbergh in California.
  - Veterans' Hospital opens east of the city.
  - City annexes town of Havelock.
  - Population grows to 75,933.
- 1931
  - Nebraska State Highway 6 renumbered as U.S. 6/U.S. 38 overlap and in 1933, the U.S. 38 route designation dropped.
  - Herpolsheimer's department store closes due to the Great Depression.
- 1932 Completion of the fourth phase of the Capitol building.
- 1937 On June 30, Congress designates U.S. 6 as a national route to honor the Grand Army of the Republic. Route is named Grand Army of The Republic.
- 1939 Arrow Aircraft & Motors declares bankruptcy and Arrow Airport closes roughly several decades later.
- 1941 Lincoln Northeast High School opened.
- 1942 Lincoln Army Airfield established at the Lincoln Air Field.
- 1945 Army closes Lincoln Army Airfield base.
- 1947 Lincoln Flying School closes.
- 1952 Lincoln Army Airfield reactivated by the Air Force for the Korean War.
- 1955 Lincoln Southeast High School opened.
- 1956
  - Bankers Life Insurance Company of Nebraska announces plans to build a $6 million shopping center next to their new campus on the east-side outskirts of Lincoln.
  - Pius X High School, a Catholic high school founded by Bishop Louis B. Kucera.
- 1957 March 10, Pershing Center, a multi-purpose arena opens.
- 1958
  - Charles Starkweather murder spree with accomplice Caril Ann Fugate. All but one of Starkweather's victims were killed between January 21 and January 29.
  - March 17, Nebraska Governor's Mansion opened with Governor Victor Anderson as the first resident.

== 1960–1999 ==
- 1960 Gateway Mall completed and opens for business at 60th and O streets.
- 1961 One of the first segments of Interstate 80 completed in Nebraska linking Lincoln to Omaha; was largely open to traffic in 1962.
- 1964 Gold's department store merges with Omaha-based department store Brandeis.
- 1965 Lincoln Children's Zoo opened.
- 1966
  - The Lincoln Electric System is formed on February 1. It would not be until 1971 when LES would have full control of its system.
  - Air Force base closes. Lincoln annexes airfield, including the base's old housing units to the west. The base becomes the Lincoln Municipal Airport under ownership of the Lincoln Airport Authority.
  - Township of West Lincoln annexed.
- 1967 Lincoln East High School opened.
- 1969 Nebraska legislature legislates laws for urban renewal. Lincoln begins program of revitalization and beautification of the city.
- 1971 Expansion of Gateway Mall completed. Expansion includes new second story indoor mall corridor connecting outlying Sears to mall with covered parking underneath the corridor.
- 1975
  - Mayor Helen Boosalis, Lincoln's first woman mayor elected.
  - After the Fall of Saigon, Vietnamese refugees are relocated to Lincoln. Lincoln designated as a "Refugee Friendly" city by the U.S. Department of State in the 1970s.
- 1977
  - Brandeis opens new store in outdoor portion of Gateway Mall adjacent to Miller & Paine.
  - Hyde Memorial Observatory established at Holmes Lake.
- 1978 Downtown beautification project completed.
- 1979 The square-block downtown Centrum opens and is connected to buildings with a skywalk.
- 1980 Brandeis closes the former Gold's downtown store.
- 1984 75% of Lincoln's revenue from retail sales tax come from within a one-mile radius of Gateway Mall.
- 1985 Bankers Life sells Gateway Mall to Jacobs Visconsi Jacobs of Cleveland.
- 1987 Brandeis purchased by Younkers department stores.
- 1988 Miller & Paine purchased by department store chain Dillard's. Miller & Paine's flagship downtown store closes shortly after purchase.
- 1995
  - Original open-air portion of Gateway Mall enclosed and expanded. Indoor mall corridor built connecting new J.C. Penney store to existing 1971 enclosed corridor.
  - Nebraska State Journal and Lincoln Star newspapers merge becoming Lincoln Journal Star.
- 1997
  - A surprise 200-year snow storm hits Lincoln and much of eastern Nebraska on October 25–26, crippling the city for nearly two weeks. 55,000 Lincoln Electric System customers lose power, including schools and some of the city's water system pumps. 13.2 inches (34 cm) of snow is officially recorded in Lincoln for the date.
  - International Quilt Study Center & Museum founded on the University of Nebraska–Lincoln campus.
- 1998 Cliffs Notes sold to IDG Books Worldwide, Inc.; all jobs associated with Cliffs Notes, except for one, are transferred out of Lincoln.

== 2000 to present ==
- Early 21st century Lincoln Municipal airport renamed Lincoln Airport.
- 2000
  - Population reaches a quarter of a million people (225,581).
  - Lincoln declared the 12th largest resettlement site for refugees per capita in the country.
  - Gallup announces move of its operational headquarters to Omaha; Lincoln begins to question itself.
- 2001
  - On January 1, the Lincoln Fire Department began both emergency and non-emergency ambulance services for the city; Rural/Metro provided service prior to 2001. Around the same time, LFD was renamed the Lincoln Fire & Rescue Department.
  - Gateway Mall purchased by Westfield America Trust. Westfield renames mall Westfield Shoppingtown Gateway.
  - Haymarket Park completed; the Lincoln Saltdogs have first home game at the park on June 1 against Sioux City (7–6) in front of 6,827 people.
  - Kawasaki begins production in its newly built rail car plant late in the year, located next to its existing Lincoln operations. It is the only rail car facility in the nation that can build a rail car from the ground-up.
  - Lancaster Event Center opens with an arena, two pavilions, and offices, with an initial pricetag of $12 million. A $10 million expansion in 2009 brought way to a third pavilion, and a 125,000-square-foot second arena.
- 2002
  - The Nebraska Cornhuskers baseball team hosts its first home game at Haymarket Park on March 5 against the University of Nebraska at Kearney.
  - The Antelope Valley Project (Phase I), a $246 million flood control, transportation and urban revitalization project, begins. It is expected that the largest public works project in Lincoln's history will take six to ten years to complete.
  - After two years of construction, Lincoln Southwest High School is completed and classes begin in August. Southwest is the first high school built in Lincoln since 1968.
  - Just after celebrating 100 years in business, Cushman is sold to Textron, Inc. and the plant closes in December. Production moves to other Textron plants in Georgia and North Carolina.
- 2003
  - Lincoln North Star Middle/High School completed.
  - December, Mary Riepma Ross Media Arts Center opens.
- 2005
  - Westfield Shoppingtown Gateway renamed Westfield Gateway.
  - Westfield made a $45 million makeover of the mall in 2005 including an expanded food court, a new west-side entrance and installation of an Italian carousel.
  - The Lincoln Police Department reactivates its motorcycle traffic unit after a nearly 30-year absence.
- 2007
  - April 15, Nebraska Holocaust Memorial in Wyuka Cemetery dedicated.
  - Lincoln receives beautification grants for improvements on O and West O Streets, west of the Harris Overpass, commemorating the history of the former Detroit-Lincoln-Denver (D-L-D) Highway.
- 2008 Nebraska Legislature votes to move State Fair Park from Lincoln to Grand Island by 2010; the University of Nebraska-Lincoln is set to acquire the park after the move and convert it into Nebraska Innovation Campus.
- 2010
  - Population is 258,379.
  - The 2010 Special Olympics USA National Games are held in Lincoln during the month of July. 2,408 athletes, 746 coaches, 258 unified partners and 8,500 volunteers attend. The Olympics also include one of the largest civilian airlifts in aviation history.
  - Nebraska State Fair moves from Lincoln to Grand Island. The former fairgrounds becomes the Nebraska Innovation Campus.
  - The Star City Parade, in its 26th year, is postponed indefinitely due to budget cuts of the Great Recession. Organizers hope to have private funding sources secured for a parade next year.
- 2011 The Lincoln Public Schools District Office burns to the ground on the night of May 30 in a four-alarm arson. Losses are estimated at $20 million, the costliest fire in Lincoln's history.
- 2012
  - Westfield America Trust sells Westfield Gateway to Starwood Capital Group. Starwood reverts mall's name from Westfield Gateway to Gateway Mall.
  - Antelope Valley Phase I is complete in early September. Phase II is postponed indefinitely.
- 2013 Pinnacle Bank Arena, an $179 million project; part of a much larger $344 bond issue (including money for the adjoining West Haymarket development), is completed with a September grand opening. Nebraska Cornhuskers men's basketball hosts its first game at the new arena in November.
- 2014
  - On May 22, the University of Nebraska–Lincoln demolished the former Cushman Motorworks building. Built in 1913 and purchased from Textron in 2003, UNL demolished the building without any notice and without demolition permits from the city. The building featured mission deco-style architecture. As of July 2016, the site of the former factory still sat empty.
  - U.S. Postal Service plans to downsize; announces plans to move Gateway U.S. Post Office to a different location. Exact location yet to be determined. Gateway Post Office has been at the same location west of Gateway Mall and north of Ameritas, formerly Bankers Life, since 1968.
  - A 200-year rain hits Lincoln over a period of 20 hours (September 30 to October 1); 4.62 inches (11.7 cm) of rain officially at the Lincoln Airport but some parts of Lincoln see up to 9 inches (23 cm). Except for numerous flooded basements, the city mostly goes unscathed.
  - Lincoln Community Foundation Tower Square, mostly completed earlier in the year, is dedicated on the winter solstice (December 21).
- 2015
  - Lincoln Mayor Chris Beutler is elected to a third term; the first mayor to be elected beyond two terms in Lincoln's history.
  - Record rains hit Lincoln, Lancaster County and southeast Nebraska. Lincoln officially receives 6.65 inches (16.9 cm) of rain on May 6 to 7 at the Lincoln Airport (with higher amounts south of the city); the most rain the city has seen during the month over any 24-hour period. Salt Creek, with a levee system built for a 50-year flood, comes within a foot of topping; its highest crest since 1908. May ends as the wettest on record for Lincoln; 10.90 inches (27.7 cm) of rain for the month.
  - The 2015 State Games of America were held in Lincoln (and surrounding areas) from July 28 to August 2. 15,244 participants from 47 states and the District of Columbia attended.
  - On November 5, it was announced that Pinnacle Bank Arena would be hosting the North, Central America & Caribbean Volleyball Confederation's Women's Olympic Qualification Tournament for the 2016 Summer Olympics on January 7–9, 2016. Teams from the United States, Canada, Puerto Rico and the Dominican Republic were expected to attend.
  - On November 17, it was announced that ALLO Communications (a Nelnet Company) would bring ultra-high speed internet to Lincoln, with speeds up to 1 Gigabit per second over the city's existing fiber network. Citywide network completion was estimated by 2019.
  - On December 18, Windstream Communications announced that 1 Gigabit internet would come to Lincoln, using its existing fiber network. It was not initially clear how many homes or businesses would have access.
- 2016
  - In mid-January, it was announced that the future of the Frank H. Woods Telephone Pioneer Museum was unclear. Its lease was ending with Windstream Communications on March 31 because the property was within "The Telegraph District" redevelopment (codeveloped by Nelnet & Speedway Properties). As of mid-February 2016, the museum's fate was still uncertain.
  - On May 19, a four-alarm fire destroyed Lincoln's oldest, independent grocery store, Ideal Grocery (905 S. 27th Street). Established in 1920, the fire was ruled accidental and the store's fate was uncertain, although the owners indicated that they hoped to rebuild.
  - On July 21, Bryan Health demolished the historic nurses' dormitory on the Bryan Health West Campus. The dormitory was one of the few remaining original buildings from the former Lincoln General Hospital.
- 2021
  - Josh fight

== See also ==
- History of Lincoln, Nebraska
- Gilded Age Plains City: The Great Sheedy Murder Trial and the Booster Ethos of Lincoln, Nebraska
- List of mayors of Lincoln, Nebraska
- National Register of Historic Places listings in Lancaster County, Nebraska
