= O Street (Lincoln, Nebraska) =

Thoroughfare in Lincoln, Nebraska, United States

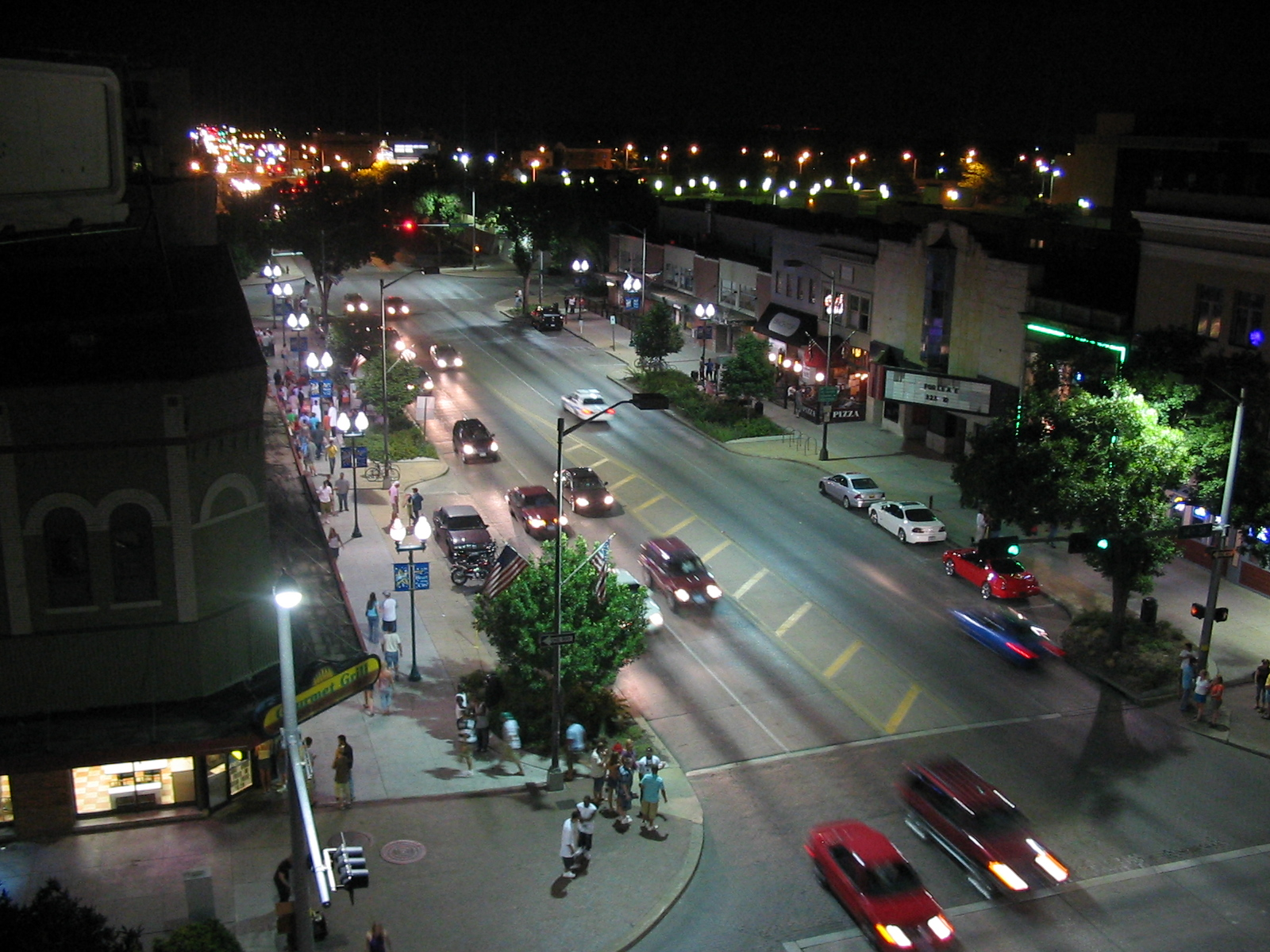
- O Street at 14th, facing east
- Length: 20 to 59 mi (32 to 95 km)
- Location: Lincoln, Nebraska
- Major junctions: US 6; US 34

O Street is the primary east–west thoroughfare in Lincoln, Nebraska. Large parts of the road are co-designated with U.S. Route 6 and U.S. Route 34. The O Street designation extends far outside of Lincoln, with "official" measurements of the street's length ranging from 20 miles to 59 miles. Some sources list it as the longest main street in the world, although this definition is debatable.

== Route description ==
The straight, paved route stretches east to Union, Nebraska and west to near Milford, Nebraska. A gravel road also designated O Street extends west beyond Milford, paralleling Interstate 80, a part of the overall grid plan that covers much of Nebraska.

=== Notable locations on O Street ===
- Lincoln City Hall
- Gateway Mall
- Terminal Building
- Wyuka Cemetery

The downtown section of O Street, near the University of Nebraska–Lincoln, is the city's largest bar and nightclub district.

== History ==
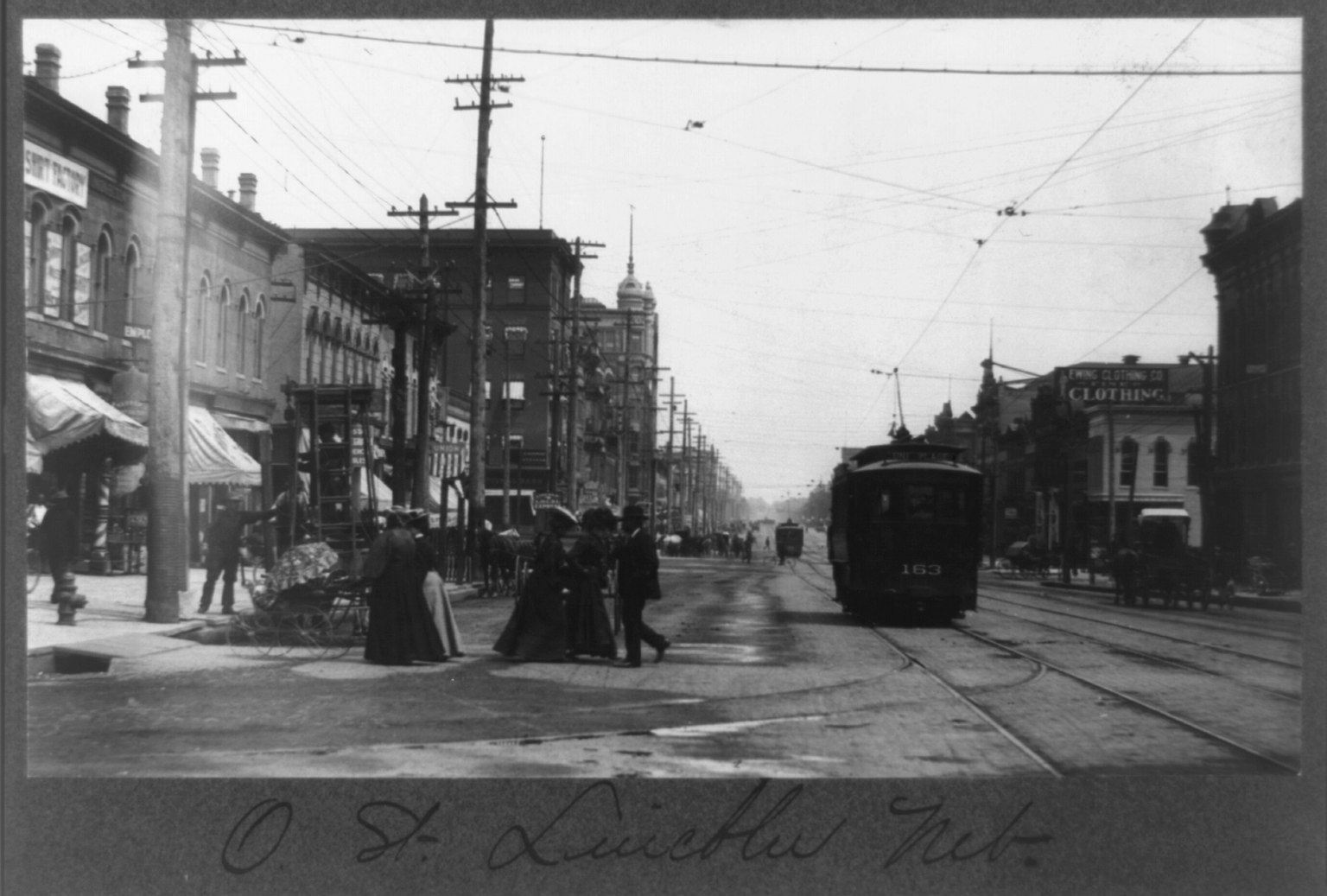
O Street with a streetcar circa 1901

The street began as a rutted wagon trail and dirt footpath. When the village of Lancaster was established in the 1860, the trail was named Locust Street; it formed the southern boundary of Lancaster. When Lancaster was designated the state capitol and renamed Lincoln, a lettered and numbered grid of streets was imposed which chanced to rename Locust Street to O Street. It became Lincoln's primary commercial street and east–west route through the city.

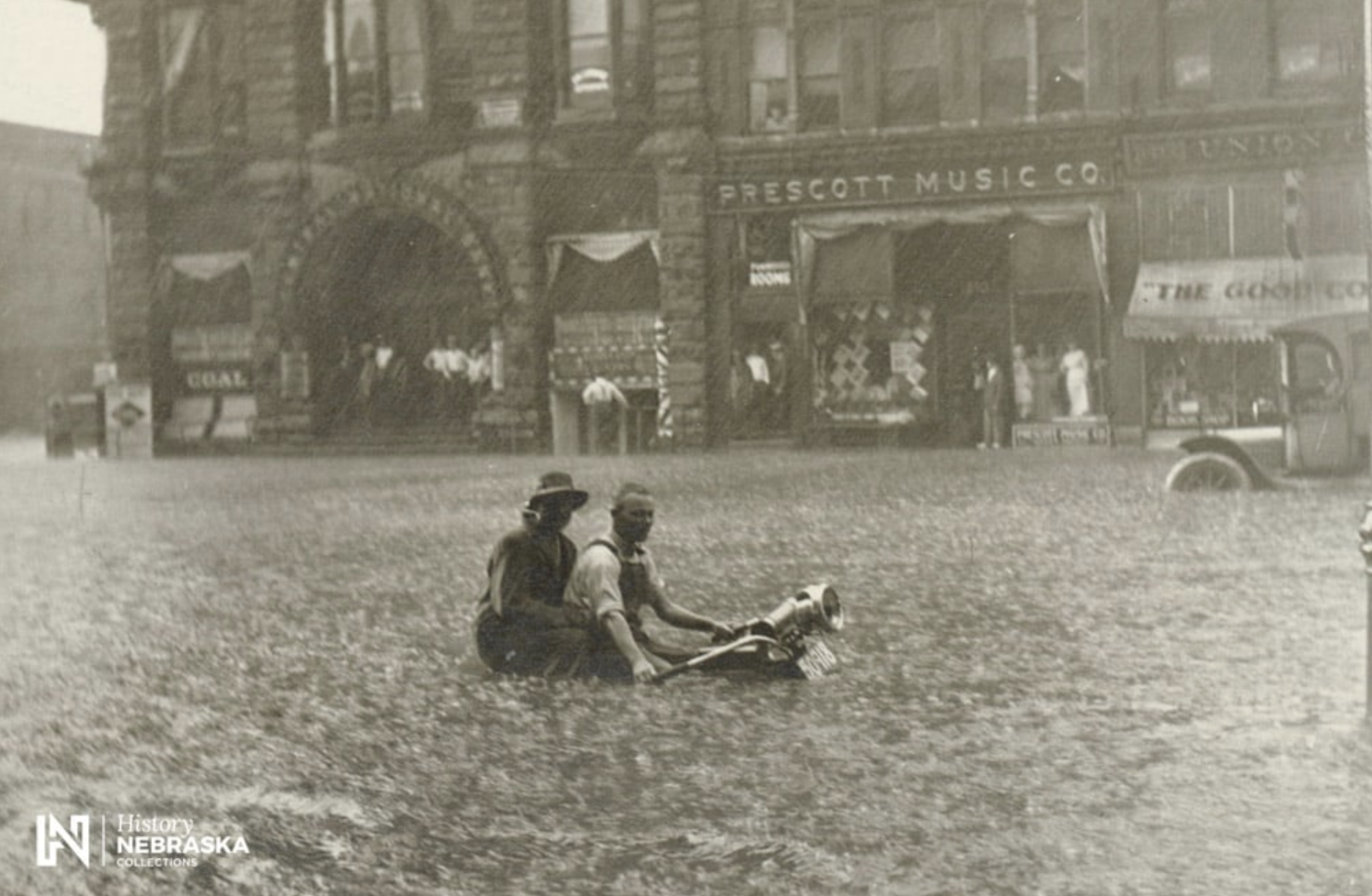
Two motorcyclists in O Street flood waters, 1912

In the 1880s a horse railway ran on the street. A flood in 1908 filled O Street with water, according to the Nebraska State Journal, in the North Bottoms area from 8th Street East to 24th Street West. Another flood filled O street in 1912. The Lincoln Aircraft Company manufactured airplanes and taught flight school at an O street factory in the 1920s; Charles Lindbergh learned to fly there in 1922.The largest bank robbery in the US took place on O Street in 1930. Franklin Delano Roosevelt was greeted by thousands of spectators on a procession up O Street during the 1936 United States presidential election. Crowds also gathered on O Street to celebrate VJ Day in 1945. Because of its central location, O Street is sometimes a site of protest. In 2025, labor unions members demonstrated against federal firings.

In 2025, the city broke ground on a project to refurbish O Street, the largest downtown revitalization project in Lincoln in 50 years.

== In literature ==
Allen Ginsberg poetically named O Street "Zero Street" in his 1960s poem "Wichita Vortex Sutra". An early version of the poem was called "Automobile Poesy to Nebraska." The University of Nebraska Press named an imprint of LGBTQ+ literature Zero Street Fiction, after Ginsberg.
