= Transtar =

Transtar may refer to:

- Transtar, Inc., a transportation subsidiary of U.S. Steel
- Transtar Airlines (Orlando, 1992–1993), an American airline company
- TranStar Airlines (Houston, 1986–1987), an American airline company
- TranStar Racing, an American automotive group
- Transtar Radio Networks, a music programming service
- International Transtar, a model of International Harvester truck
- Houston TranStar, which provides traffic and emergency management in Greater Houston
- Trans*, an umbrella term for transgender and transsexual

== See also ==
- StarTran, the public transit bus system in Lincoln, Nebraska, United States
