= Conestoga Marketplace =

Outdoor shopping mall in Grand Island, Nebraska

Conestoga Mall (Conestoga Marketplace)
- Location: Grand Island, Nebraska, United States
- Coordinates: 40°56′03″N 98°22′51″W
- Address: 3404 W 13th Street, Grand Island, NE 68803
- Opened: March 20, 1974 (original); 2024 (current outdoor shop
- Closed: May 8, 2024 (Conestoga Mall)
- Demolished: 2023–2024 (partial)
- Developer: Ericson Development
- Owner: Woodsonia Real Estate
- Architect: Edward M. Cohon & Associates, Limited
- Num. of stores: 33 (original)
- Num. of anchor tenants: 2
- Floor area: 611,719 sq ft (56,830.6 m^{2})
- Floors: 1
- Website: shopconestogamall.com

Conestoga Marketplace is an outdoor shopping mall in Grand Island, Nebraska. The current mall opened in May 2024. The mall was originally opened in 1974 as Conestoga Mall, an enclosed shopping mall. The mall was redeveloped in 2023 by its current owner, Woodsonia Real Estate. The mall's anchors are Target and Best Buy.

== History ==
=== Conestoga Mall ===
Conestoga Mall was announced in December 1972. Developed by Ericson Development of Edina, Minnesota, construction began in February 1973. The mall officially opened in 1974. At the time, it included Miller & Paine and Brandeis as its anchors. Later expansions brought Sears and JCPenney as anchors, as well as regional department store chain J.M. McDonald.

Dillard's purchased Miller & Paine in 1988, and Younkers purchased Brandeis in 1987. Best Buy later joined as a junior anchor, located in part of the former J.M. McDonald space. In 2003, J. Herzog & Sons bought the mall from the Richard E. Jacobs group, which had put it up for sale in 1999. In 2017, New York-Based Namdar Realty Group purchased the mall.

The Younkers store closed in August 2018 with the liquidation of its owner, Bon-Ton Stores. The mall's Sears location closed in early 2019 as part of a plan to close 40 stores nationwide. On June 4, 2020, it was announced that JCPenney would be closing around October 2020 as part of a plan to close 154 stores nationwide. On February 1, 2023, it was announced that Dillard's would be closing its location at the mall leaving it with only Best Buy as the remaining anchor.

In early 2023, the mall was sold to Omaha-based Woodsonia Real Estate. The company announced a $250 million redevelopment plan for the site, to be renamed Conestoga Marketplace. Most of the mall was demolished, including the vacant anchor stores, excluding Best Buy. Under the plan, the rest of the mall would be converted into an outdoor mall. A hotel and apartments would also be added on outparcels. The final remaining interior corridor closed on May 9, 2024, as tenants relocated to the new outside-facing retail space.

=== Conestoga Marketplace ===
Conestoga Mall re-branded to Conestoga Marketplace and officially opened on May 9, 2024. In November 2024, the Target location began construction and officially opened on October 12, 2025. The B&B Theatres location opened in May 2025.
