= Hinky Dinky =

Defunct supermarket chain

- Founded: 1925; 101 years ago
- Defunct: 2000; 26 years ago
- Fate: sold to Nash Finch, all locations closed or rebranded
- Headquarters: Omaha, Nebraska, U.S.

Hinky Dinky was a supermarket chain based in Omaha, Nebraska, that operated mainly in Nebraska and Iowa.

== History ==
The Hinky Dinky grocery store chain was started by Jule, Henry and Albert Newman, brothers, and Ben Silver, a cousin, in Omaha in 1925. Another supermarket chain already existing was called Piggly Wiggly. Hoping to take advantage of the public's affection for a cute name (Piggly Wiggly was very successful) they came up with "Hinky-Dinky", which was taken from the World War I song, “Hinky Dinky Parlez-vous” (see Mademoiselle from Armentières).

In 1972, Hinky Dinky was purchased by Cullum Companies of Dallas, which operated the Tom Thumb grocery chain. At its peak, Hinky Dinky operated approximately 50 stores. But Cullum was using profits from Hinky Dinky to support the operations of the Tom Thumb stores, and comparatively little reinvestment was made in the Hinky Dinky stores. A 1984 strike by unionized workers also hurt revenue. By the mid-1980s many Hinky Dinky stores had been sold or closed, leaving only a handful of stores in scattered locations. Ron Badley purchased the Hinky Dinky name and several stores from Cullum in 1985. In 2000 the remaining stores were sold to grocery distributor Nash Finch, which dropped the name on all of the stores.

Hinky Dinky was a pioneer in partnering with banks to open in-store banking offices. For instance, in April 1974, the retail chain entered into an agreement with the First Federal Savings & Loan to deploy dedicated stalls while providing banking services within the stores. These booths were equipped with a terminal that enable verification, recording transactions, and updating accounts directly with the bank on the spot. The terminals became so popular amongst savings banks in the late 1970s that they became known by the "Hinky Dinky" moniker amongst bankers.

== In popular culture ==
- In the television series Better Call Saul, Season 2 Episode 7 'Inflatable' (2016), Kim Wexler mentions the chain by saying that if she didn't leave her hometown she would probably be married to the guy who ran the town gas station, and maybe working as a cashier at Hinky Dinky.
- The freeform radio station WFMU streams the weekly show "Hinky Dinky Time with Uncle Michael" on Fridays at 12 noon Eastern Time. The show's opening theme is a mélange that includes a snippet from a Hinky Dinky grocery store jingle.
