= Miller & Paine =

Department store in Lincoln, Nebraska

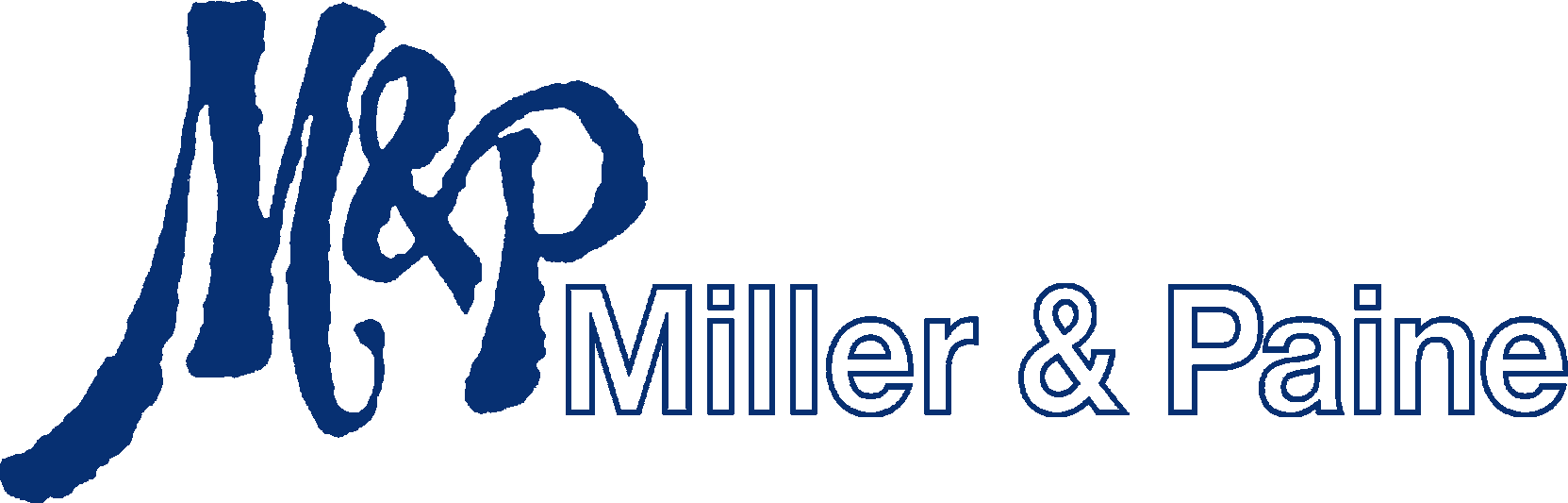
- Industry: Retail Department Store
- Founded: 1880
- Founders: John Eschelman Miller and Dr. Bartlett Paine
- Fate: Acquired in 1988 by Dillard's
- Headquarters: Lincoln, Nebraska, US

Miller & Paine was a department store in Lincoln, Nebraska. Founded in 1880, Miller & Paine was acquired by Dillard's in 1988. Prior to the acquisition by Dillard's, Miller & Paine had three stores: two in Lincoln, the downtown flagship store and Gateway Mall with one in the Conestoga Mall in Grand Island, Nebraska. Miller & Paine was one of the first department stores in Lincoln.

== History ==
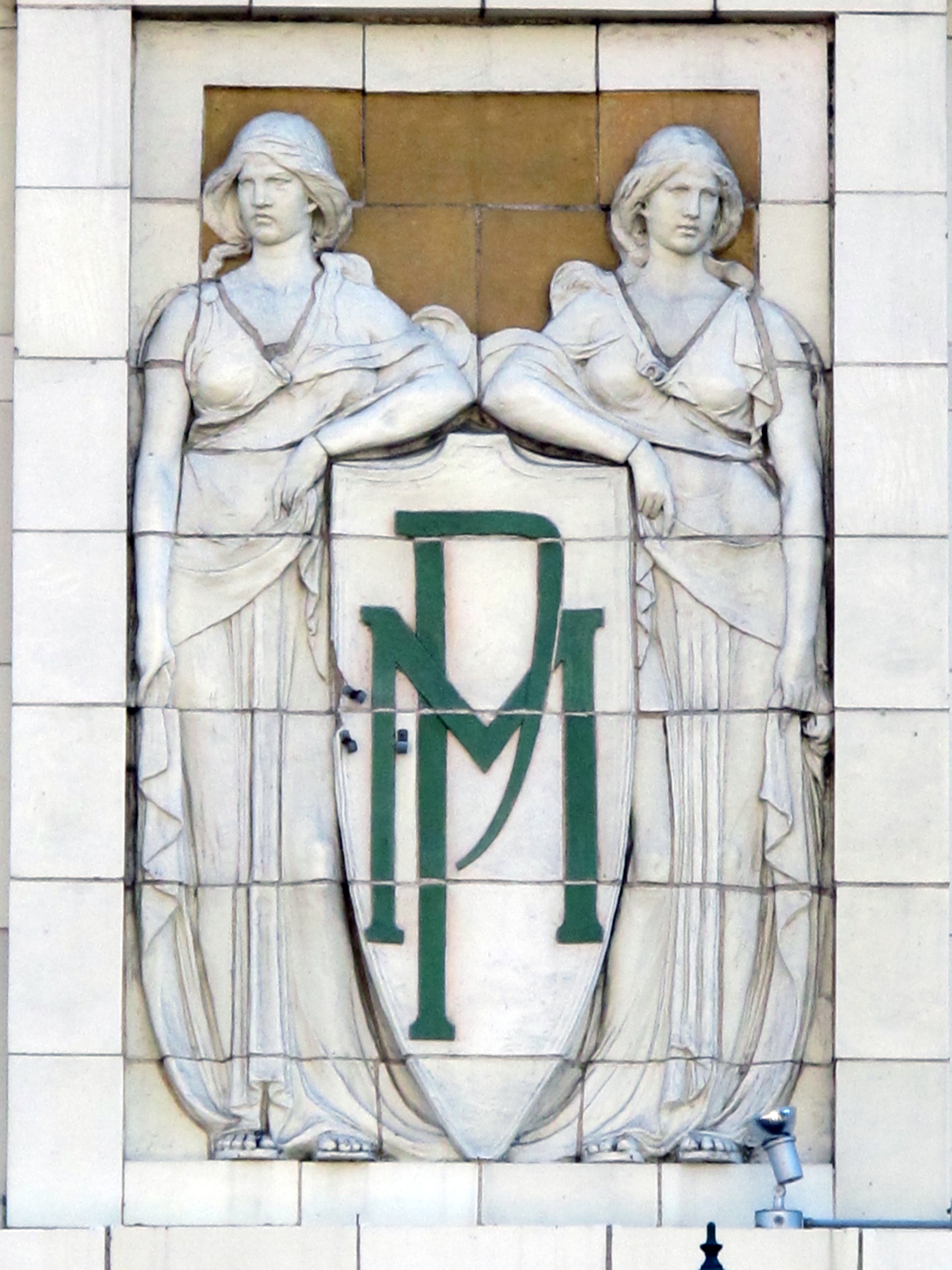
Miller & Paine crest

John Eschelman Miller arrived in Lincoln from Pennsylvania in 1879 and in 1880 formed a partnership with Dr. Bartlett Paine to build a department store at 13th and O streets in downtown Lincoln. The building was built in 1898. The store was named Miller & Paine. In 1916, a new building was constructed on the site at 13th and O streets. The new building was designed by Berlinghof & Davis. In 1935, Miller & Paine became the first air-conditioned department store in Nebraska.

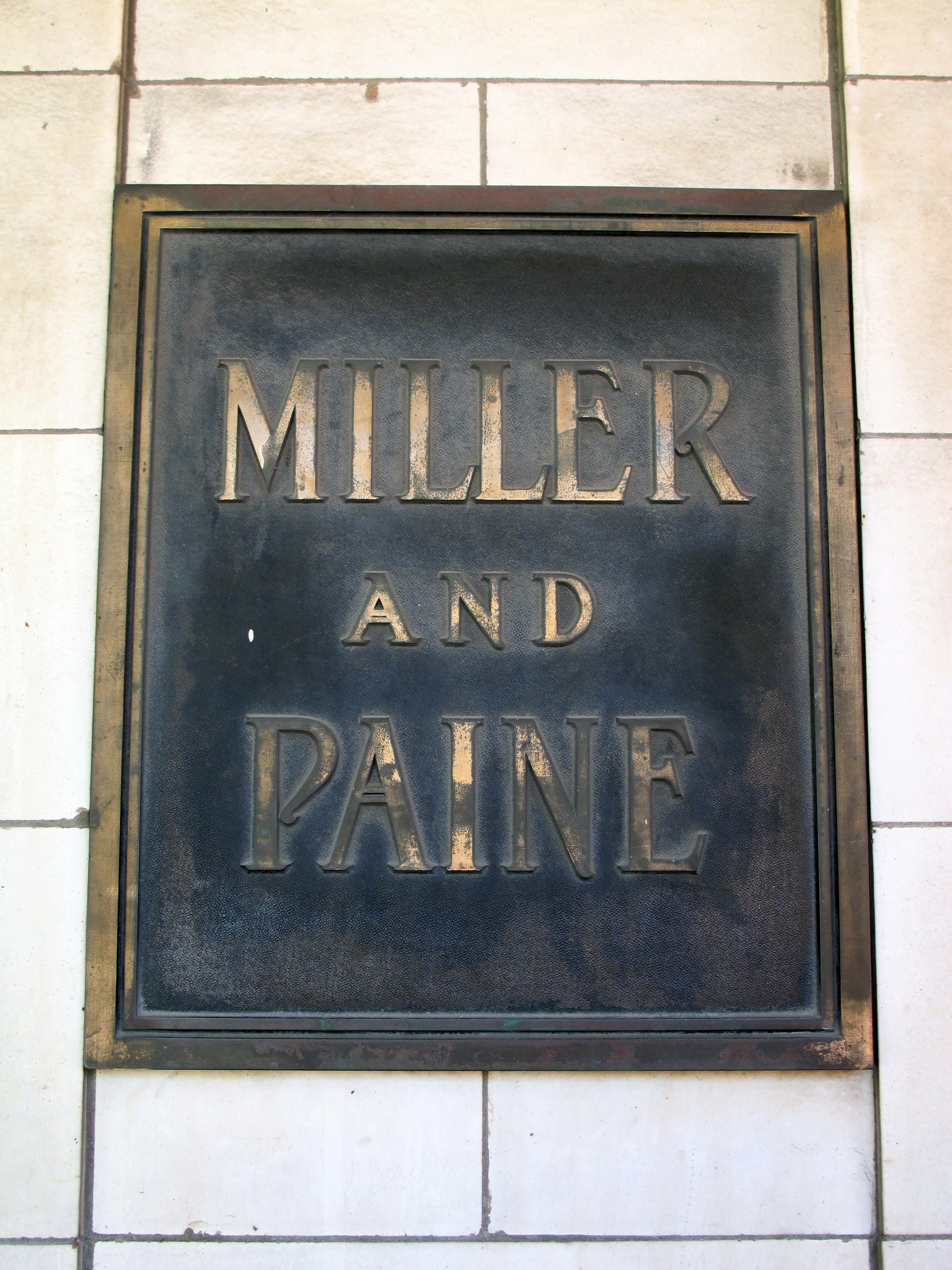
Miller & Paine downtown store plaque

Miller & Paine had a lunch counter in the basement and the Tea Room on the fifth floor in the flagship downtown store. Besides having the tearoom and lunch counter, they also had a bakery that was famous for its cinnamon rolls and crumb cookies and made their own candy to sell in their candy department. Miller & Paine imported cinnamon for its trademark cinnamon rolls, and sharp English cheddar cheese for its macaroni & cheese which was served crusted in its own individual serving bowl. The company also owned a farm near Emerald, Nebraska for its own supply of poultry, vegetables and eggs.

From 1917 to 1921, John Eschelman Miller, cofounder of Miller & Paine, served as the mayor of Lincoln, Nebraska. In 1938, after the death of Miller, Robert Erle Campbell took over as chairman of the board of Miller & Paine, and from 1940 to 1941, he also served as Lincoln's mayor after being selected by the Lincoln City Council to fill a vacancy in the mayor's office.

Classic logo

In 1960, Miller & Paine opened a store in the newly developed Gateway Mall in Lincoln as an anchor store and in 1974, Miller & Paine opened a store in the Conestoga Mall in Grand Island.

Miller & Paine sold their department stores in 1988 to Dillard's. The department stores ceased to use the name Miller & Paine re-branding the stores Dillard's. Shortly after the purchase, Dillard's closed the downtown store.

The company Miller & Paine continues to operate today as Miller & Paine LLC which operates properties in Lincoln, Nebraska. The building designed by Berlinghof & Davis at 13th and O Streets is still in use as offices. The trademark Miller & Paine cinnamon rolls which were once served in the department store's tearooms continue to be produced and sold by the Lincoln, Nebraska-based fast food restaurant Runza, which purchased the rights to the recipe in 2007.
