= City Hall (Lincoln, Nebraska) =

- U.S. National Register of Historic Places
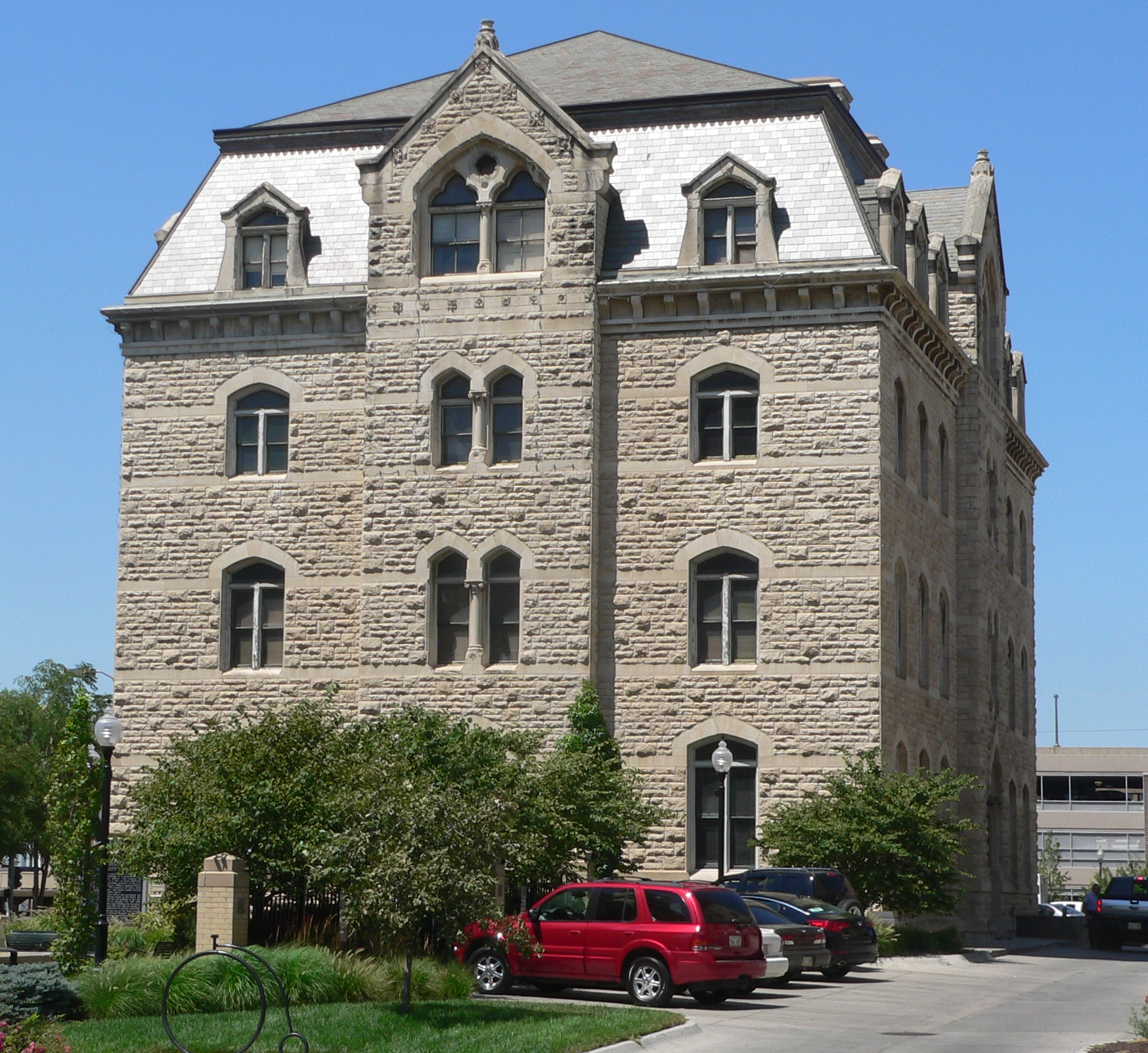

- Location within Nebraska Location within the United States
- Location: 920 O St., Lincoln, Nebraska
- Coordinates: 40°48′50″N 96°42′27″W
- Area: less than one acre
- Built: 1874
- Architect: Office of the Supervising Architect under Alfred B. Mullett and William A. Potter
- Architectural style: Gothic
- NRHP reference No.: 69000132
- Added to NRHP: October 15, 1969

Lincoln City Hall is the former seat of the Lincoln, Nebraska city government. The hall was built from 1874-1879 as the U.S. Post Office and Court House, designed by the office of the U.S. Treasury Department's architect, Alfred B. Mullett. A new post office and court house was built in 1906 and the property was transferred to the city. It was superseded as city hall in 1969 when the city government moved into the City-County Building. Although Mullett is officially listed as the architect, much of the design work may have been carried out by his assistant, William Appleton Potter, who specialized in the Gothic style.

== Description ==
City Hall is built of brick faced with rough limestone blocks. It is four stories tall with a basement, measuring 60 feet (18 m) by 90 feet (27 m) in plan. The exterior is detailed in an austere High Victorian Gothic style, capped by a mansard roof. The interior is similarly finished, with Gothic details in the woodwork. The style was influenced by the work of John Ruskin.

Lincoln City Hall was placed on the National Register of Historic Places on October 15, 1969.
