= StarTran =

Transportation service in Lincoln, Nebraska

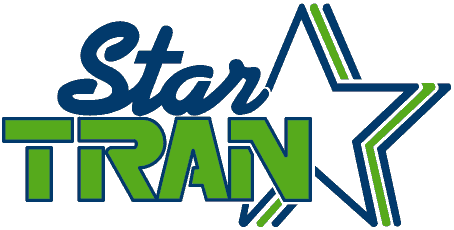

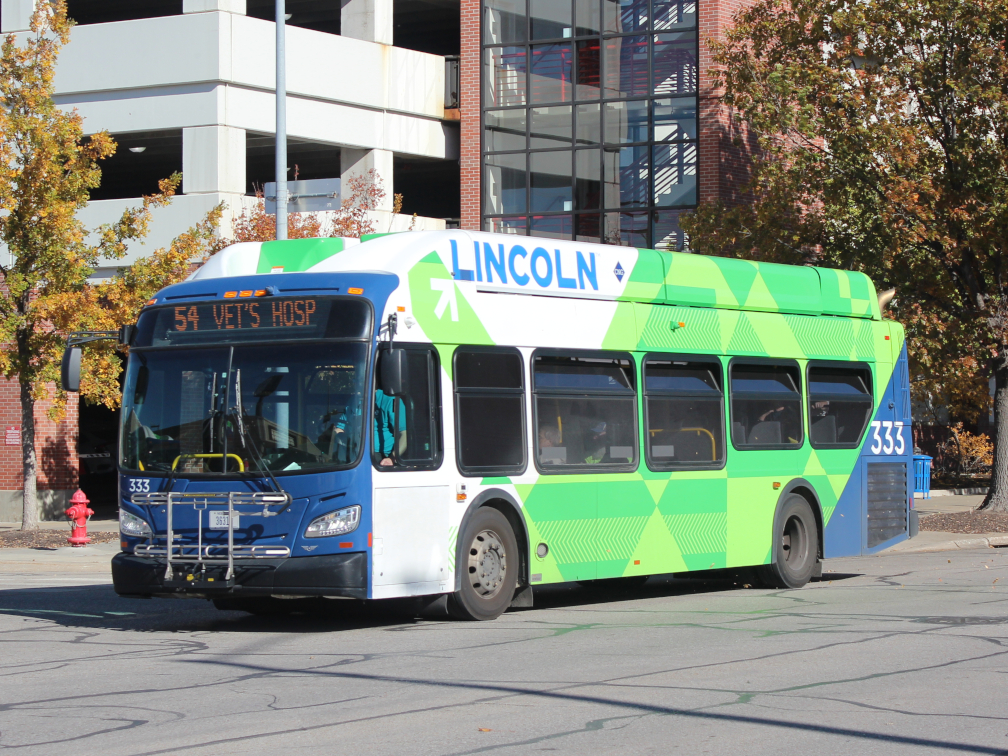
- StarTran #333, a 2022 New Flyer XN35 bus fueled by compressed natural gas.
- Headquarters: 710 'J' Street
- Locale: Lincoln, Nebraska
- Service area: Lincoln, Nebraska
- Service type: Bus service; Paratransit
- Routes: 18
- Hubs: Gold's Building
- Fleet: 16 Gillig transit bus 39 CNG New Flyer; 10 electric New Flyer; 1 Ford 2013 Handi-Van; 1 2012 Star Craft Handi-Van; 11 2010 Glaval Handi-Van
- Annual ridership: 2,378,652 (2017)
- Fuel type: Biodiesel, CNG, Electric
- Operator: City Of Lincoln, Nebraska
- Website: lincoln.ne.gov/startran

StarTran is the public transit bus system in Lincoln, Nebraska, United States. It operates 18 regular bus routes and a downtown circulator service on weekdays from 5:15 a.m. to 9:55 p.m. and Saturdays from 5:55 a.m. to 7:05 p.m. There is no service on Sundays. There is a special Handi-Van transportation service for those who have a disability that prevents them from riding a regular city bus.

== History ==
In May 1971, a bond issue was announced, which would create a city-owned public bus transportation service for Lincoln. The bond issue passed that same month, and Lincoln officially took ownership of the previous transportation service in July 1971. This formed the Lincoln Transportation System, which officially launched upon the buyout.

In 1988, the Lincoln City Council voted to officially change the name to StarTran. However, the name StarTran was already in use by a brand of transmission oil. However, city council went forward with the rebrand, and the StarTran name was officially put into use in August 1988.

In September 2016, it was announced that StarTran would make rides free in October and November. Additionally, StarTran announced that it would be adding additional bus routes and converting some buses to using natural gas. In 2018, StarTran announced a downtown trolley system, with access to major venues. Service began in December 2018.

In 2020, StarTran announced an on-demand service for requesting a ride called VANLNK. At launch in April 2020, VANLNK had 27 vehicles, most mini-vans. In 2021, the Department of Transportation awarded the City of Lincoln $2.7 million to purchase three electric buses for StarTran.

In January 2024, it was announced that the main bus transfer system would be moved to a new location for a new one. These plans met criticism from many over how this would impact parking and bathrooms for local businesses. In spite of the criticisms, the transfer station moved in January 2025.

== Fixed Route Ridership ==
The ridership and service statistics shown here are of fixed route services only and do not include demand response. Per capita statistics are based on the Lincoln urbanized area as reported in NTD data. Starting in 2011, 2010 census numbers replace the 2000 census numbers to calculate per capita statistics.

	Ridership	Change	Ridership per capita
2002	1,512,264	n/a	6.67
2003	1,427,957	▼5.57%	6.3
2004	1,538,457	▲7.74%	6.79
2005	1,702,110	▲10.64%	7.51
2006	1,796,817	▲5.56%	7.93
2007	1,834,499	▲2.1%	8.1
2008	1,879,362	▲2.45%	8.29
2009	1,664,279	▼11.44%	7.35
2010	1,811,433	▲8.84%	7.99
2011	1,947,971	▲7.01%	7.53
2012	2,002,943	▲2.82%	7.74
2013	2,381,003	▲18.88%	9.2
2014	2,422,789	▲1.75%	9.36
2015	2,303,641	▼4.92%	8.9
2016	2,210,968	▼4.02%	8.55
2017	2,328,468	▲5.31%	9.0
2018	2,413,703	▲3.66%	9.33
2019	2,382,269	▼1.3%	9.21
2020	1,554,796	▼34.73%	6.01
2021	1,926,279	▲23.89%	7.45
2022	2,190,825	▲13.73%	8.47

== See also ==
- List of bus transit systems in the United States
