= Union Airport (Nebraska) =

Former airport in Lincoln, Nebraska

Coordinates: 40°52′30″N 096°37′45″W

- IATA: none; ICAO: none

Summary
- Location: Lincoln, Nebraska
- Opened: 1920
- Closed: 1964
- Interactive map of Union Airport

Union Airport was a former civil airport and military airfield located approximately 5 miles (8.0 km) north-northeast of Lincoln, Nebraska. Today the land formerly occupied by the airport is an agricultural industrial estate and fields.

== History ==
The airport was established in 1920 as the "Lincoln Airplane & Flying School", owned by E. J. Sias. The airport had two main runways, one 1,820-foot (13/31) and a 1,650-foot (17/35). In 1939 the site was chosen by the United States Army Air Corps to provide basic (level 1) flying training to flight cadets. It was assigned to the Gulf Coast Training Center (later Central Flying Training Command). Flying training was performed with Boeing PT-17 Stearmans assigned. The airport was expanded to a six-runway configuration with 2,400-foot 08/26; 2,100-foot 14;32; 2,000-foot 03/21; and 2,100-foot 17/35 sod runways, basically an all-direction grass field.

Military flight training ended on 30 June 1944 with the drawdown of AAFTC's pilot training program. It returned to civilian ownership, being transferred to the city of Lincoln in 1952 as a civil airport. It was operated as a general aviation airport until 1964. The airport closed when the city of Lincoln completed a 4,000-foot runway to allow joint military-civilian use of Lincoln Air Force Base.

== See also ==
- Nebraska World War II Army Airfields
