= Gilded Age Plains City =

Gilded Age Plains City: The Great Sheedy Murder Trial and the Booster Ethos of Lincoln, Nebraska is a work of digital history hosted by the University of Nebraska–Lincoln which uses the January 1891 murder of Lincoln, Nebraska resident John Sheedy and subsequent murder trial as a means to gain insight into Great Plains urban development during the Gilded Age. The site is an extension of the research and scholarship done by Timothy R. Mahoney, Professor of History at the University of Nebraska–Lincoln, in his article "The Great Sheedy Murder Case and the Booster Ethos of the Gilded Age in Lincoln, Nebraska," which was published in Nebraska History quarterly and won the 2001 James L. Sellers Memorial Award. Gilded Age Plains City explores not only local history and regional history, but also urban history, social history, cultural history, and issues of race and gender.

== Site Organization and Content ==
The site has three primary sections: "Explore the City," "Spatial Narratives," and "Interpretation and Narrative." "Explore the City" contains an interactive map and an introduction to the city of Lincoln, Nebraska as it existed during the Gilded Age. "Spatial Narratives" includes a discussion of what a spatial narrative is as well as a brief overview of the spatial narratives of eight different groups of interest in Gilded Age Lincoln: lawyers, boosters (and boosterism), male subculture, African Americans, manufacturing and railroad infrastructure, women, the working class, and the University of Nebraska–Lincoln. "Interpretation and Narrative" contains five subsections which summarize and analyze events pertaining to the murder of John Sheedy, the murder trial, and widespread interest generated by the case.

Gilded Age Plains City possesses a wide variety of primary source material available for users to not only view, but also sort, search, and (in some cases) download. This makes the site's Document Archive quite similar to a thematic research collection, although it is perhaps more narrow in scope than most such collections. The site's Document Archive includes transcriptions and photographs/images of legal documents, letters, and newspaper articles related to the murder trial as well as photographs, postcard images, and newspaper illustrations of the city of Lincoln during the 1890s. Biographies of all of the major historical characters involved are available, and hyperlinks ensure their presence throughout nearly all areas of the site. A glossary of historical terms, phrases, and organizations is also provided.

Some historians have suggested that "academic historians, like other citizens, should insist on a role in this new 'public space'" (of the World Wide Web). Gilded Age Plains City may be a step in this direction.
