= Gateway Mall (Nebraska) =

Shopping mall in Lincoln, Nebraska

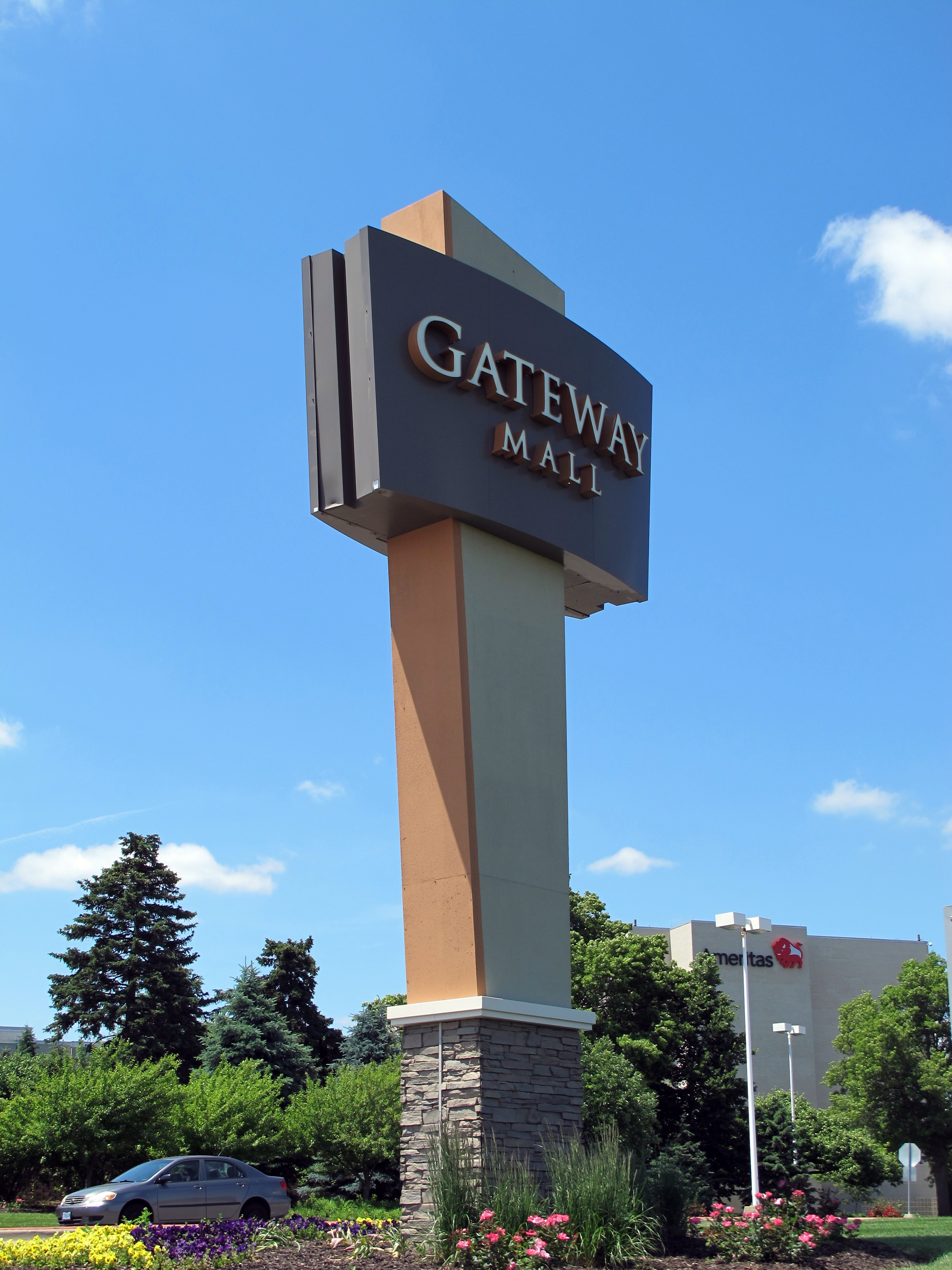
- Location: Lincoln, Nebraska, United States
- Coordinates: 40.815°N 96.634°W
- Address: 5 Gateway Mall
- Opened: 1960
- Renovated: 1993–1995; 2003–2005
- Developer: Bankers Life Insurance Company of Nebraska
- Manager: CBL Properties
- Owner: CBL Properties
- Num. of stores: 107
- Num. of anchor tenants: 3
- Floor area: 975,000 sq ft (90,600 m^{2})
- Floors: 1 (2 in Dick's Sporting Goods, JCPenney, former Sears, and former Younkers, 3 in Dillard's)
- Public transit: StarTran
- Website: shopgatewaymall.com

Gateway Mall, formerly known as Gateway Shopping Center and Westfield Shoppingtown Gateway, is an enclosed shopping mall located in Lincoln, Nebraska managed by CBL Properties. It was built in 1960, and is the largest shopping center in Lincoln, with 107 stores. The mall's anchor stores are Dillard's, Dick's Sporting Goods, Round 1 Entertainment, and JCPenney. Gateway Mall was originally announced and began construction in the late 1950s, and was planned to be the largest mall in the State of Nebraska.

The mall officially opened in 1960 and was expanded in the early 1970s. Originally an outdoor mall, renovations in the 1990s enclosed the mall. After the mall was purchased in 2001, the name was officially changed to Westfield Shoppingtown Gateway, and the mall went under further expansion. The mall was then sold in 2012 and was renamed to Gateway Mall.

== History ==
In 1957, plans for Gateway Mall, then known as Gateway Shopping Center, were announced. It was developed by Bankers Life Insurance Company of Nebraska. It would cost an estimated $4.5 million and would be 30 acres (12 hectares) large. Construction began in 1959, and it was planned to be Nebraska's largest suburban shopping area. Gateway Mall officially opened in 1960.

In 1970, an expansion that would double the size of Gateway Mall was announced. In 1971, it was announced that part of the expansion would be adding a new Sears location inside of the building. Most expansions to the building were completed by 1971.

Bankers Life sold the mall in 1985 to Jacobs Visconsi Jacobs (later The Jacobs Group). In the mid-1990s, the building was remodeled and expanded. This included enclosing multiple parts of the then-open air mall. Most of construction was completed in 1994. The expansion would also add a JCPenney, which opened in 1995.

Westfield Group purchased the mall in 2001. In 2003, it was announced that the mall would officially change its name to Westfield Shoppingtown Gateway. The $45 million renovation added a new food court and carousel in the Center Court area.

In June, 2012, Starwood Capital Group acquired the mall from Westfield and the name changed back to Gateway Mall. In June 2013, several new stores opened at the mall, including Forever 21, which replaced one level of the former Montgomery Ward/Steve & Barry's. In June 2016, it was announced that Dick's Sporting Goods would build a 70,000-square-foot store at the mall, which opened September 22, 2017. It will be built on the site of Granite City Food & Brewery, which has built a restaurant just west of the previous location.

On April 18, 2018, it was announced that Younkers would be closing as parent company The Bon-Ton Stores was going out of business. The store closed on August 29, 2018. Dillard's took over the empty space. In March 2019, Sears closed its location as part of a plan to close 80 stores nationwide.

On November 19, 2019, it was announced that Forever 21 would be closing as well as part of a plan to close 178 stores nationwide. The store closed on November 23, 2019. Due to the COVID-19 pandemic, Gateway Mall remained closed until April 2020. In May 2022, Starwood Capital sold the property to Washington Prime Group for $51.5 million. The mall was sold again to CBL Properties on March 5, 2026.
