= Focus programs in Lincoln, Nebraska =

The LPS focus programs are small public magnet high schools, established and run by Lincoln Public Schools to serve the needs of academically gifted students.

== Individual schools ==
As of 2009, there are four focus programs:

- Arts and Humanities Focus Program
- Entrepreneurship Focus Program
- Information Technology Focus Program
- Science Focus Program

== Background ==
Each school typically enrolls under one hundred students each year with the intent of creating a community in which students can receive individualized attention along with a curriculum centered on the school's respective focus. Admissions are based by application, which involves a short essay of intent. Generally, graduation requirements are not wholly met through the classes offered at focus programs alone, so students will often attend the high school in which they would normally be enrolled in for a couple class periods in the morning and then commute to the focus programs during the school day. Classes run on block scheduling.

== History ==
In 1997, Zoo School began as a project initiated by Dennis Van Horn and a group of teachers from various high schools in the district. The model of organization used by Zoo School has since been replicated by the other focus programs, which emerged one after another in the following decade. Most recently, the Entrepreneurship Focus Program was established in 2006 in the Southeast Community College Entrepreneurship Center.
