= Trashing =

Trashing may refer to:

- Garbage picking, particularly if used to obtain documents or confidential information
- Information diving
- Vandalism
- Trashing: The Dark Side of Sisterhood, a 1976 article by feminist Jo Freeman

== See also ==
- Thrashing (disambiguation)
