= Pershing Elementary School =

There are a number of elementary schools named Pershing Elementary School:

- Pershing Elementary School (Lincoln, Nebraska)
- Pershing Elementary School (West Allis, Wisconsin)
