= Tamarisk (disambiguation) =

Tamarisk is a common name for plants in the genus Tamarix, also referred to as saltcedar

Tamarisk may also refer to:

- Tamarisk (colour), named after the colour of Tamarix flowers
- Tamarisk, East Lansing, Michigan, a neighborhood in East Lansing, Michigan
- Tamarisk (Isles of Scilly), a British royal residence
- Tamarisk (horse), a racehorse that was named European Champion Sprinter in 1998
- Operation Tamarisk, a Cold War espionage operation

== See also ==
- Tamarisk jird, a rodent native to Central Asia
