= Dump digging =

Excavating garbage dumps to find objects of interest

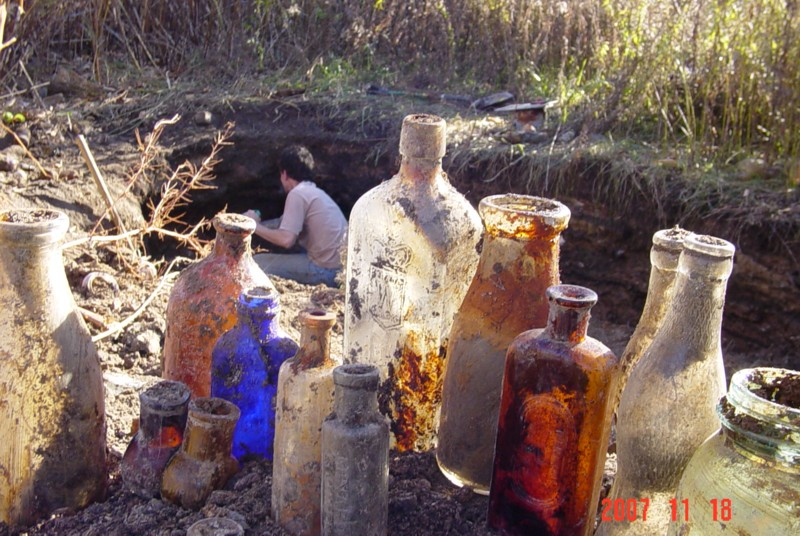
Glassware and pottery found in an old dump in Meaford, Ontario

Dump digging is the practice of locating and excavating old garbage dumps with the intent of discovering objects which have potential value as collectibles or antiques. These dumps are sometimes centuries old, but often date to the late 19th century or early part of the 20th century. Among other things, the practice of dump digging is directly linked to antique bottle collecting and glassmaking.

It is a form of historical digging which involves long hours working with a shovel, pick and other hand tools. Finding evidence of potential antique bottle dumps or middens is done by searching areas where it is likely that older garbage was deposited. Diggers generally look for clues of pre-1920s junk piles in the woods or down embankments, places where old houses or businesses stand or once stood. Hiking along waterways and swampy areas, particularly during droughts, can also produce important clues and lead to good discoveries.

Additionally, many coastal cities are surrounded by landfills or "tips", places where enormous quantities of trash were deposited in the past, intended to free up additional acres of viable real estate. It can take many months of searching each of these locations for a decent dig area to be found.

== Background ==
Dump digging for potentially valuable collectibles is at least as old as the Pharaohs. For practical reasons, dump diggers often use a much less forensic style than academic archaeologists or museum curators would on their projects. Not unlike the privies, cisterns and wells that other historical diggers explore and salvage in, dumps are typically temporary sources. They are often located on properties which are in the process of being permanently altered by major development and other factors.

== Items found and locations ==
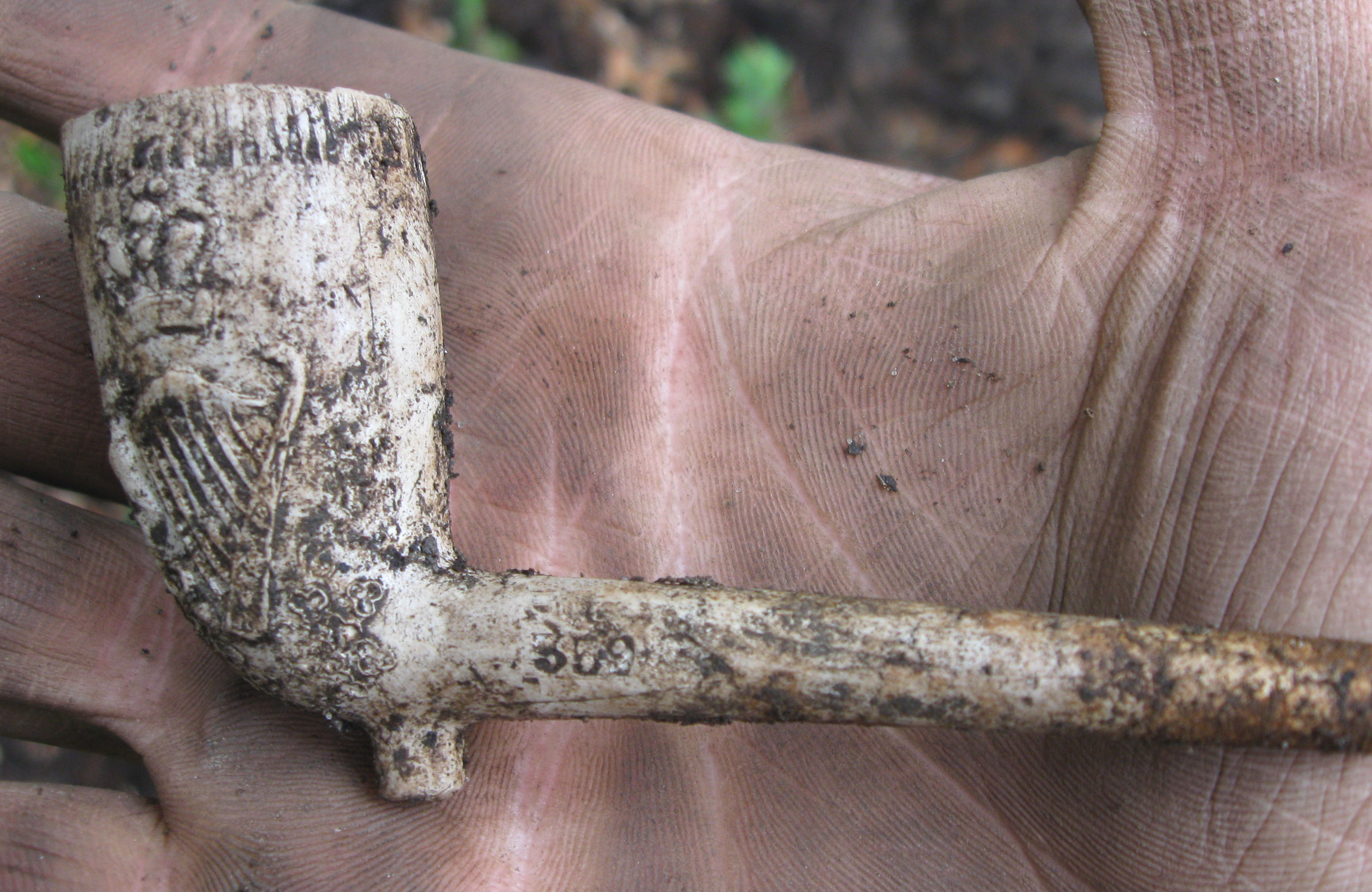
A clay pipe discovered while excavating an old bottle dump (ca. 1870)

Dump digging can yield different items and artifacts in each location. A town dump can be somewhat different from a farm dump or a railroad dump, but in each case there could be industrial-age pottery, stoneware, tobacco pipes, military relics like bayonets and gun barrels, musket balls, uniform buttons and other buttons, marbles and an assortment of other items. A high percentage of these dump discoveries are routinely found in severe states of decay, damaged or broken altogether. In many cases, even items which have remained reasonably intact have little if any monetary value; however, cases where well-preserved items have been found which are significantly valuable have motivated dump diggers to continue their work. Culturally-significant items can be found by the process of dump digging.

Through the common process known as tipping, vast amounts of refuse generated by towns and cities were dumped into harbors, along marshy shorelines and other areas while forming viable real estate cheaply. Excavating in these areas is also a form of dump digging. Elusive and often deep, small portions of these ashy landfill dumps are sometimes rediscovered during major development projects. Enormous quantities of a given location's everyday trash were deposited into these often difficult to reach locales. The bulk of this garbage has never been investigated, and at present, much of it is still undiscovered.

For centuries, active waterways were also frequently converted into major dumping spots for household and industrial refuse; but they are generally impossible to reach without expensive equipment.

== See also ==
- Garbology
- Historical digging
- Privy digging
- Landfill mining
- Metal detector
- Midden
- Tucson Garbage Project
- Sea glass
- Beachcombing
