= Post-medieval archaeology =

Archaeological sub-discipline

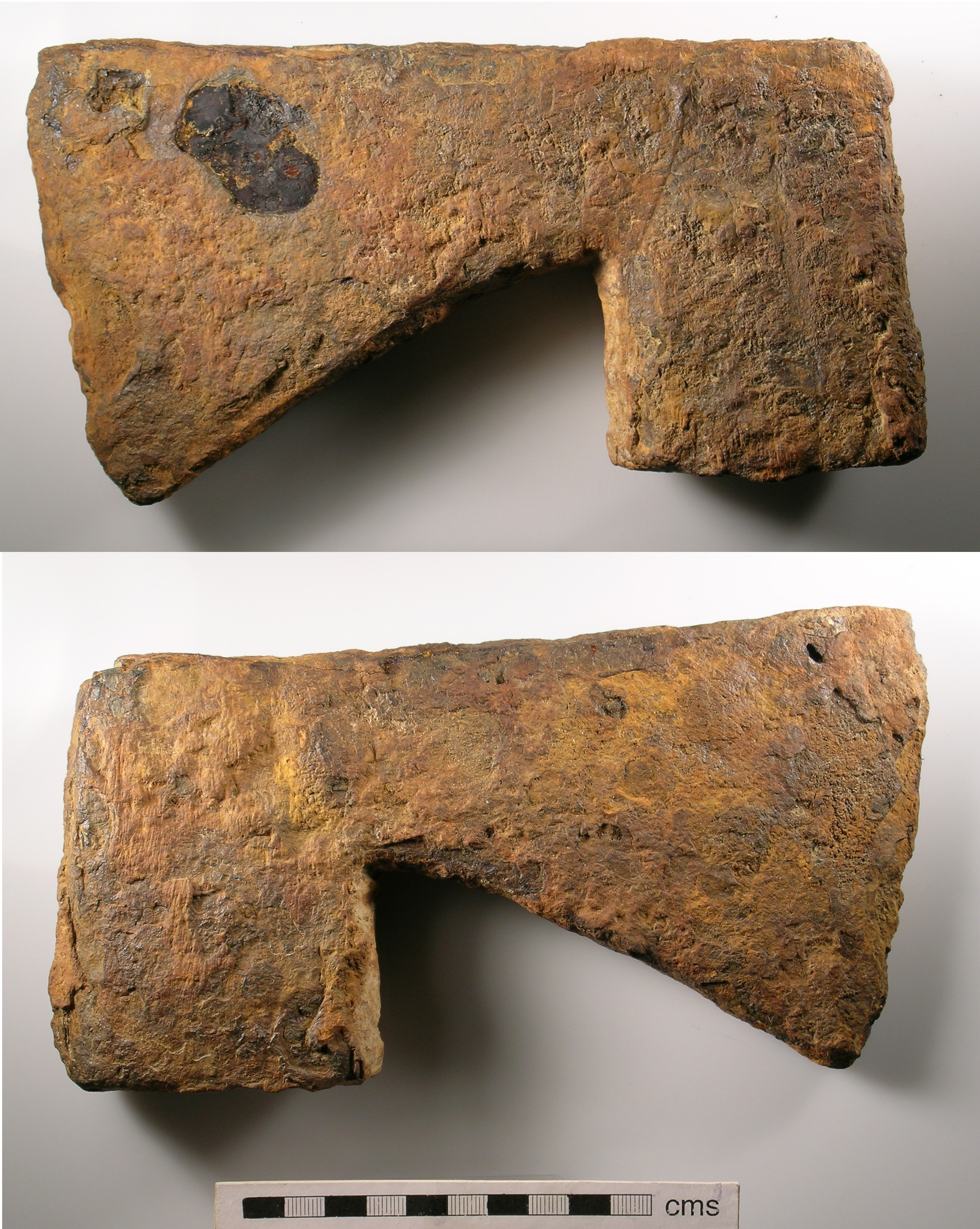
Post-medieval, Axe (FindID 153446)

Post-medieval archaeology is a term used in Europe to describe the study of the material past over the last 500 years. The field is also referred to as historical archaeology, a term originating in North America, and common in countries impacted by European colonialism. It is closely related to industrial archaeology and contemporary archaeology. Many scholars have found a connection between post-medieval and contemporary archaeology particularly in how scholars can view their archaeological study and apply in their own present contexts. It is also crucial by studying both post-medieval and contemporary archaeology that it can benefit the future of archaeology, particularly as scholars can apply the studies in more recent periods as time progresses.

Initially post-medieval archaeology did not extend its studies past the mid 18th century, though as a result of subsequent critiques within the field this cut-off date has been discarded, and the Society for Post-Medieval Archaeology, Europe's leading professional society for the period, now explicitly considers its remit to be "the archaeology of the post-medieval world up to the present day and beyond".

The emergence of post-medieval archaeology began in the second half of the 20th century by exploring primarily European cultures such as Germany, France, The Mediterranean, and Scandinavia. This was done after World War II, where archaeology was primarily focused on richer countries in Europe such as Hungary, Czechoslovakia, and Poland. Ever since then, there has been an emergence in studying post-medieval archaeology which has expanded along with the expansion of access to education and differing educational studies. This emergence of archaeology has also expanded the field of archaeological study and has allowed further study in the field of archaeology.

The traditional date for the beginning of the post-medieval period in Britain has been 1485 when, following the Battle of Bosworth, the Tudor dynasty took the throne. In practice, the medieval period is now often extended into the reign of the Tudor monarchs and the boundary between the two eras is not precise. As with all attempts to neatly periodise the archaeological record, efforts to impose an exact date on the transition are doomed to be questioned by current and new findings. As there is the urge to learn more about post-medieval archaeology in Europe, there is an additional urge to explore post-medieval archaeology in the wider world. Archaeologists and historians are hoping to expand the study of post-medieval archaeology to help better learn about the way of life after the medieval period.

Given the relatively strong historical record running alongside the archaeological one, post-medieval archaeology is often strongly positioned to study the effects of known social and political change. The immediacy of the period means that it appeals in fields such as genealogy as well as to students of social history.

Post-medieval sites include Nonsuch Palace in Surrey, the Rose Theatre in London and Fort Amherst in Chatham.

== History ==
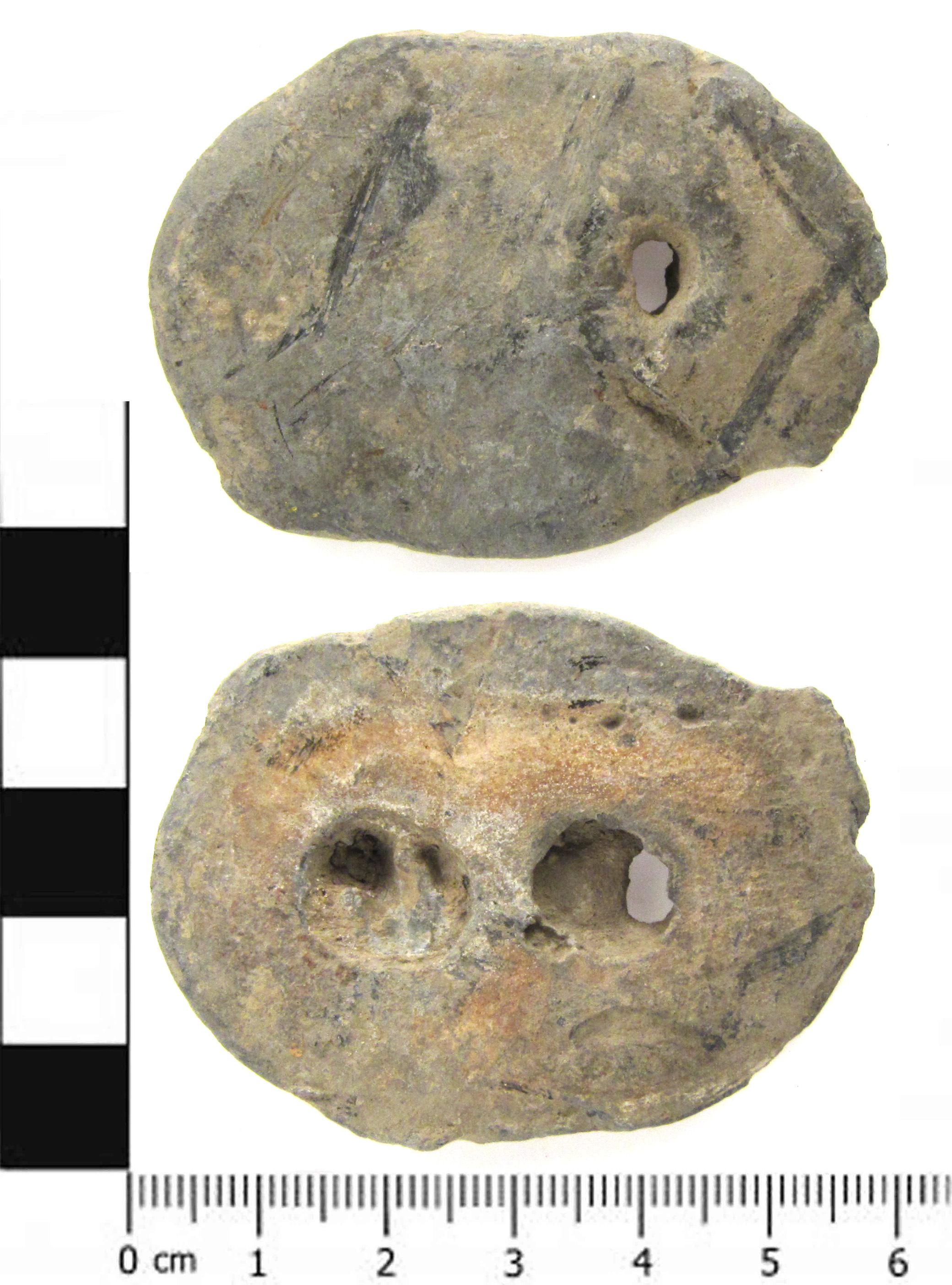
A post medieval or modern artefact, possibly a palm guard (FindID 440571)

The emergence of post-medieval archaeology was first recognised in the 1970s in Europe. Before there had been no specific studies associated with this archaeological term. Considering prior to World War II, the use of archaeology wasn’t presented to examine the history and artefacts of Europe. This emergence of the term post-medieval archaeology was crucial in revealing parts of Europe which hadn’t gained full recognition and by further expanding the story of these European countries. It was also crucial in expanding further knowledge of Europe, which would benefit for tourism opportunities. For present day, the exploration of post-medieval archaeology continues to be explored. There is an expansion in the way that archaeologists take part in the different practices of archaeology and how the study of archaeology is accessed. For the future, the study of post-medieval archaeology is an ongoing practice which archaeologists are striving to uncover and connect with differing archaeological studies. During the beginnings of the study of post-medieval archaeology, there has been an issue regarding how to define the subject, and even had become a term which had been isolated in certain European settings. This is due to how the study of post-medieval archaeology can be viewed as an umbrella term in how it covers various periods of history. However, it is important to recognise the subject matter in a study of post-medieval archaeology and question how post-medieval archaeology can be displayed in a general term. Throughout the study of post-medieval archaeology, it is argued that it can be practised without written sources, that it primarily functions on the physical grand artefacts. Just like the study of history, post-medieval archaeology can benefit from the use of written sources. Additionally, the study of post-medieval archaeology goes beyond merely studying artefacts. It benefits to study the role of religion and other aspects which benefit archaeologists in gaining a better understanding of way of living. In a book titled ‘The Archaeology of Post-medieval Religion’, it strives to understand post-medieval religion, which can benefit study into other factors of post-medieval life such as the role of gender and other cultural aspects. A majority of research articles about this study of archaeology can be credited to the Society for Post-Medieval Archaeology. Another aspect of post-medieval archaeology finds that there is a focus on a fresh perspective in archaeological approaches. This is due to how discussions surrounding contemporary archaeological matters influence a better appreciation for the past and thus influencing archaeological research.

== The Society for Post-Medieval Archaeology ==
The Society for Post-Medieval Archaeology is an ongoing leading society regarding the study of historical archaeology in the post-medieval period. It is a society which was stemmed from the Post-Medieval Ceramic Research Group, which was established in the 1960s. With this establishment, there was a gradual increase in their influence, however in the beginning they experienced financial difficulties in relation to printing research papers and articles. The 1970s saw a period of inflation which hugely affected the production of research. The initial focus for this society was on British archaeology, yet there is a desire to explore further archaeology in Europe through the post-medieval period. In present day, the expansion of this society has grown to include the study of post-medieval archaeology outside of Europe. The society produces a journal titled ‘Post-Medieval Archaeology’, which archives all types of post-medieval archaeology from around the world. There have been additional discussions in the present day about the reputation and the way that the society strives to engage with this study of archaeology. This links to the recent discussions about the society including archaeology which leads up to the present day. The Society for Post-Medieval Archaeology’s response shows that it is inclusive of all archaeological studies in striving to promote their enthusiasm for the study of archaeology.

== Contribution to Contemporary Archaeology ==
Through the continued research of post-medieval archaeology, many academics including those in the Society for Post-Medieval Archaeology, have found a connection between the post-medieval and contemporary archaeology. As the discovery of post-medieval archaeology has emerged, there is a link with contemporary archaeology as it encourages archaeologists to look at their current lives and the way they engage with archaeological study. Additionally, the rise in contemporary archaeology allowed for archaeologists and people studying to be able to examine their own way of living in the present moment. The term contemporary archaeology is a term which doesn’t display clarity in what period of archaeology it examines. According to the Post-Medieval Archaeology journal, it examines that the role of ‘contemporary’ is lacking, in the way that there is conflict regarding the way that the term contemporary is interpreted in archaeology. Through the initial research of this debate of what to label as contemporary, academics and archaeologists rely on public research and social support for mainstream archaeological aide. Contemporary archaeology links with post-medieval archaeology as it is rooted on the future of studying archaeology. Through various studies which archaeologists have done, many of them including Hilary Orange who conducted research on artificial light in relation to her studies finds the relationship between the methods of post-medieval and contemporary archaeology. Ultimately, both of these studies of archaeology are being examined for future use, which intrigues many archaeologists and those in the Society for Post-Medieval Archaeology. Additionally, there are certain areas of study in archaeology which can draw a connection between post-medieval and contemporary. One of these is the study of battle and conflict. These areas of study blend the two areas of archaeology together as well as providing further study conducted by academics and archaeologists. Contemporary archaeology is crucial through the study of urban archaeology, as it furthers understanding regarding material dynamics in past living conditions. This information can thus be related to our own way of living and further enhance the continued study of archaeology.

== Post-Medieval Archaeology in different cultures ==
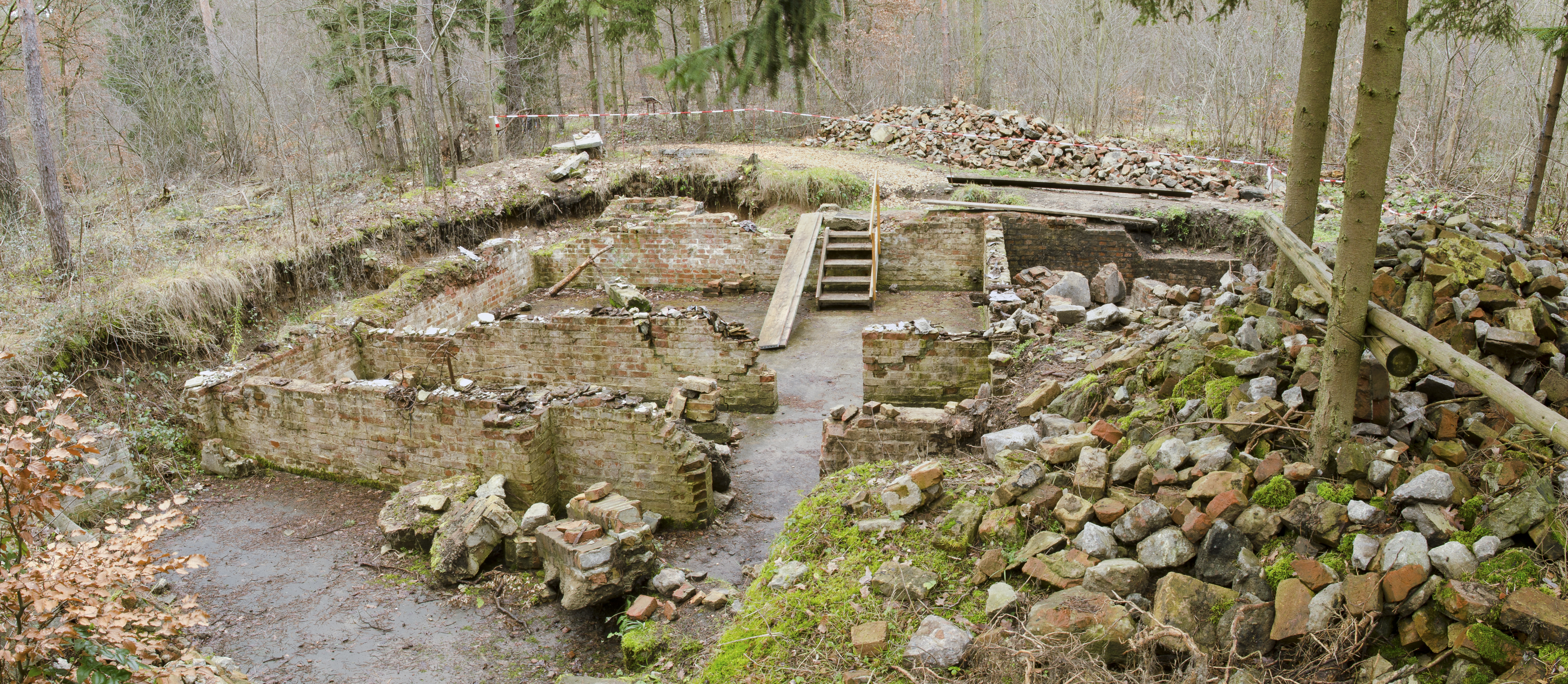
Former cellar of kitchen barrack - Nazi labour camp Walldorf - Airport Frankfurt - Züblin - Ehemaliger Keller der Küchenbaracke - KZ-Außenlager Walldorf - Flughafen Frankfurt - 05b

The study of post-medieval archaeology was initially used to examine European cultures following the medieval period. Whilst post-medieval archaeology has a strong presence in learning about archaeology in Europe, there is an urge to delve deeper in learning about archaeology in other parts of the world.

=== Germany ===
The post-medieval archaeology of Germany can be linked to the study of World War II in Nazi Germany, as it is a subject with ongoing study and inquiry. The study of post-medieval archaeology can be used to examine the archaeology of Nazi Germany in relation to the populations and human activity of the Nazi region during the period before and during World War II. Additionally, the study of post-medieval archaeology has brought about a new finding for artefacts which came from the post-medieval period. Aspects such as Christian burials were considered important artefacts in this period, even though it came with its own complications, it produced research for burial grounds in Germany.

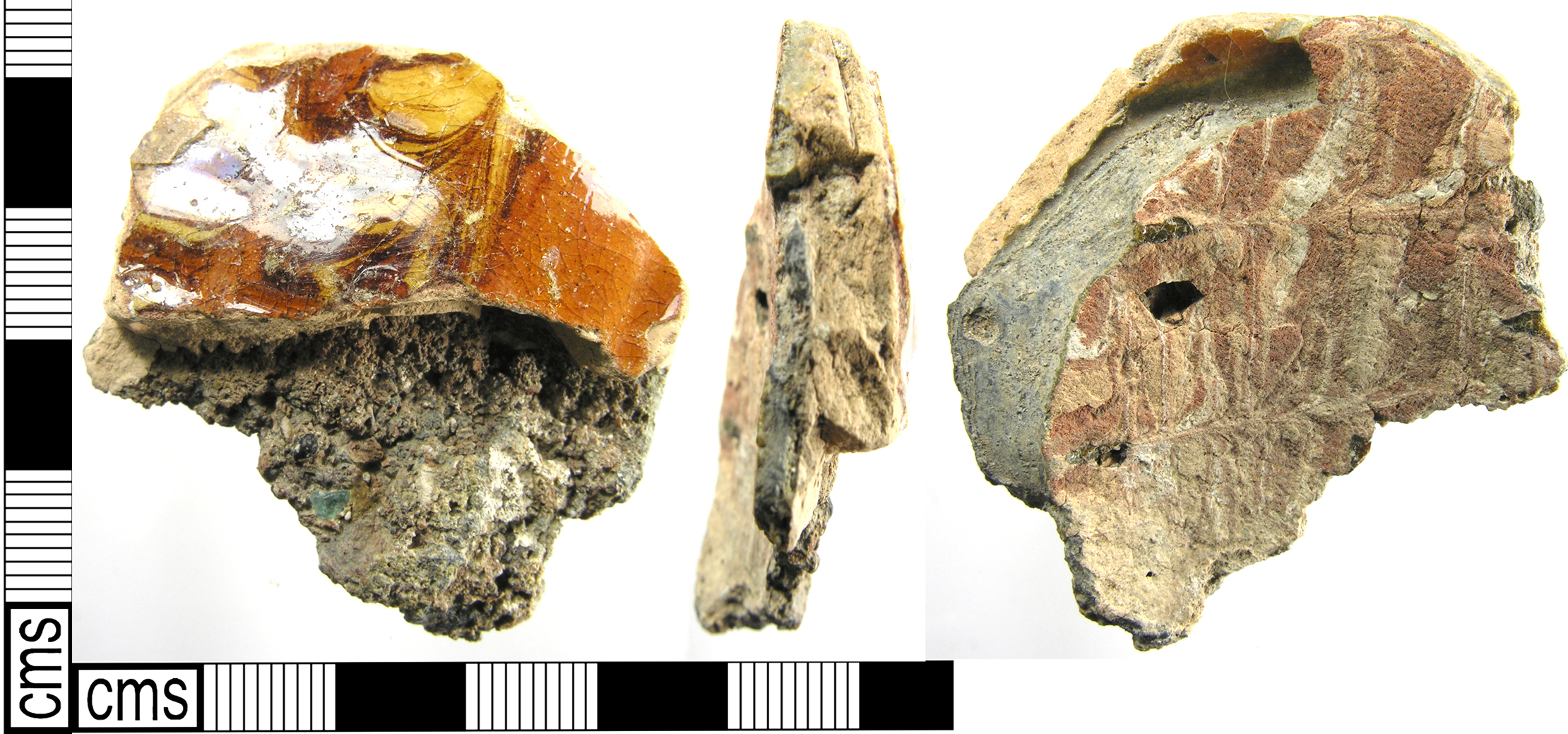
A fragment of Post Medieval pottery vessel, probably a locally made version of North Italian slip ware dating to the 1640s. (FindID 279105)

=== Italy ===
The post-medieval archaeology of Italy was first researched in the 1960s and 1970s to investigate archaeological evidence. Eventually there was a growing pursuit to study not only post-medieval archaeology but also rural archaeology specifically in urban parts of Italy. Through post-medieval archaeology, archaeologists found many artefacts which can be classified in this period of study. In addition, there was an environmental focus for post-medieval archaeology which has influenced the ways of studying the land management during this period.

=== France ===
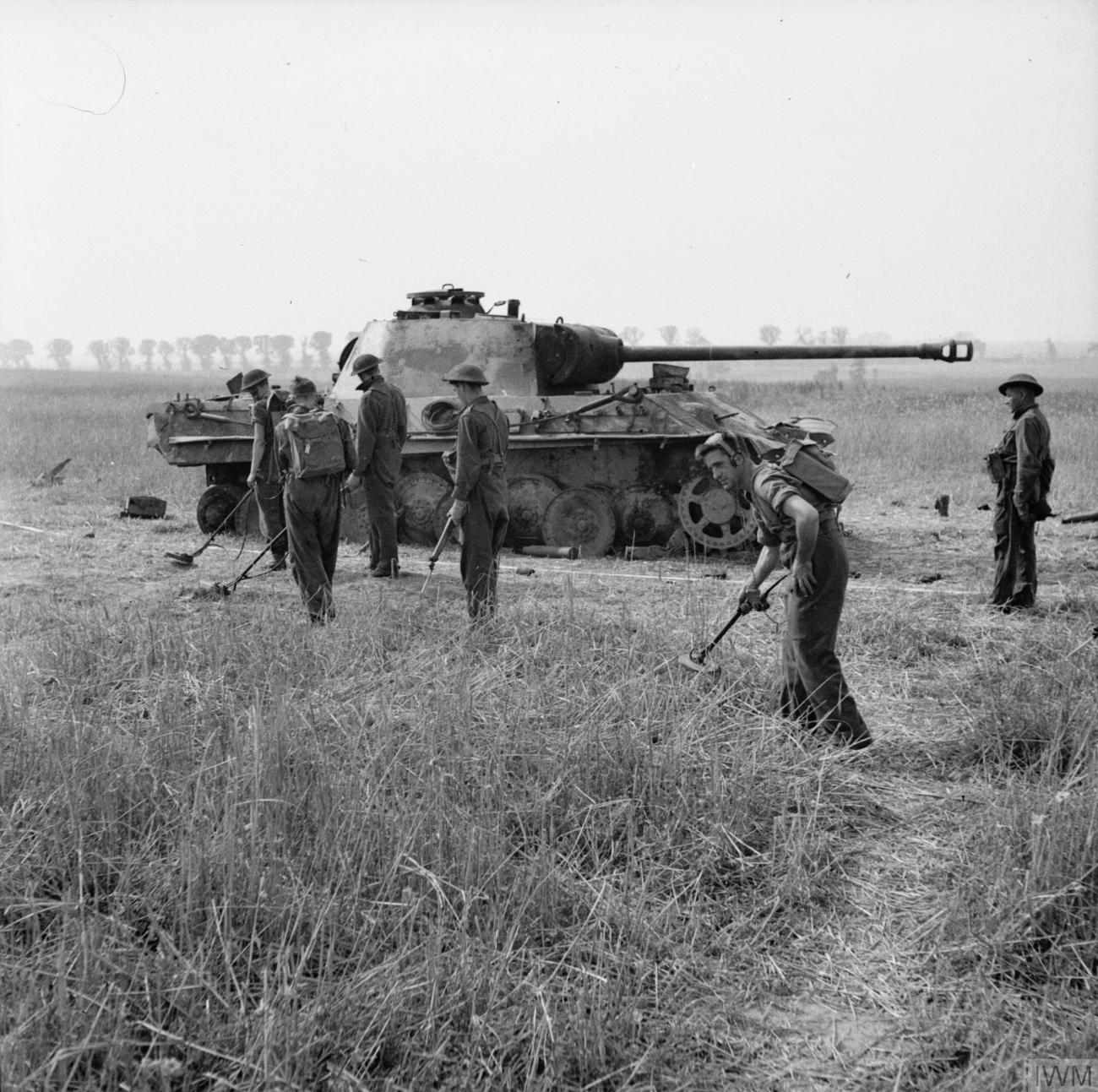
The British Army in the Normandy Campaign 1944 B8573

The post-medieval archaeology of France is extensive in relation to France’s vast history. Like the general pursuit of archaeology, the study of post-medieval archaeology in France commenced in the late 1960s. French post-medieval archaeology can extend up to World War II, with campaigns including the 1944 Normandy Campaign, in which archaeologists’ study both the battlefield and its artefacts but also the urbanisation of that period. Furthermore, the use of post-medieval archaeology in France can be expanded based on colonialism. There are French archaeology sites that extend beyond France, such as the Saint-Louis forts and chateaux site in Canada which allows archaeologists to examine French expansion and what is referred to as the “new France”. Through the study of post-medieval archaeology in France, it can be linked to Canadian archaeology through France’s expansion in Canada. A great number of archaeology studies were undertaken in these archaeological sites such as the Fortress of Louisburg and other urban estates in Canada after France claimed territory. With this information, it expands the knowledge of post-medieval archaeology and drifts it away from being mainly focused on Europe and more expansive in the wider world.

=== Portugal ===
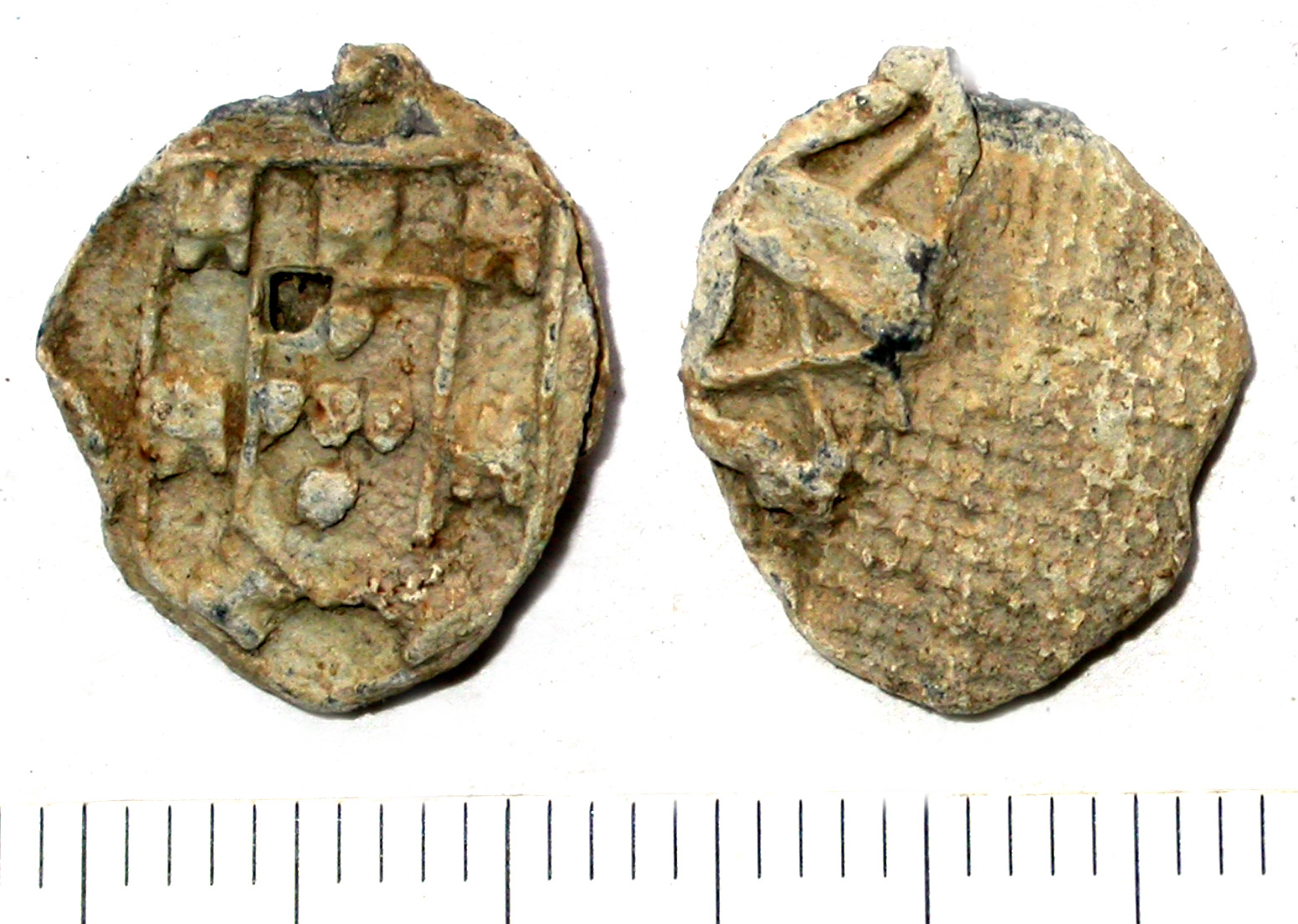
Post medieval, Portuguese cloth seal (FindID 235456)

The beginnings of studying post-medieval archaeology in Portugal began in the 1980s and yet it was a while before it was recognised as an academic field of archaeological study. The post-medieval archaeology of Portugal is predominantly focused on the periods between the 16th and 18th century. It is additionally notable for its distinct artefacts which have been found which many appear to be imported from places outside of Portugal. A big factor concerning post-medieval archaeology of Portugal was through the Carnation Revolution in which Portuguese people became more intrigued by their culture and urban archaeology. Following this, there were certain laws which allowed archaeological study as well as construction work, which displayed a lacking in the study as many archaeologists didn’t appear to have a background in medieval or post-medieval history. Notable factors of post-medieval archaeology in Portugal include the many sites in Lisbon. This includes the remains of buildings that were due to the 1775 Lisbon earthquake. Post-medieval archaeology of Portugal also extends beyond Portugal itself. The discovery of Portuguese pottery was examined in Southampton, England. This artefact of Merida-type ware was presented in an assemblage in Southampton. Whilst there is no accurate dating, it is believed that these importations to England began in the 13th century and expanded through the post-medieval period.
