= Science Focus =

Science Focus may refer to:

- Hocus Science Focus, a movie shown at the Israel National Museum of Science, Technology, and Space
- Science Focus Program, a part of the Lincoln, Nebraska public school system
- Sciencefocus.com, website of the British monthly magazine BBC Science Focus
