= Privy digging =

Process of locating and investigating the contents of defunct outhouse vaults

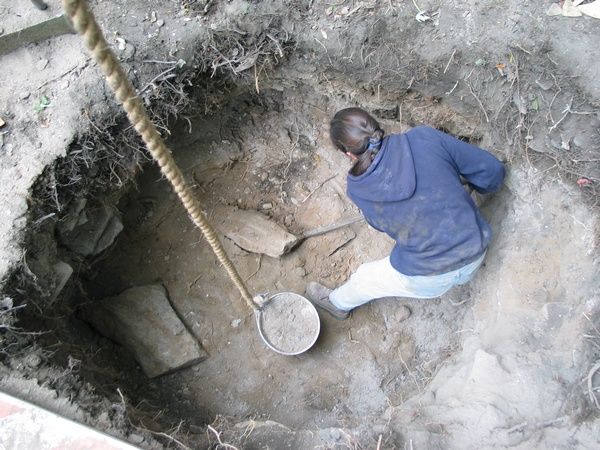
Removing rocks and other debris in a very large urban privy (c. 1855).

Privy digging is the process of locating and investigating the contents of defunct outhouse vaults. The purpose of privy digging is the salvage of antique bottles and everyday household artifacts from the past. Privy digging is a form of historical digging and is often conducted on private residential properties. Construction sites and major developments around older areas of towns and cities are also likely places to look for evidence of privies.

Historical contractors (privy diggers who dare to enter into contracts enabling them to investigate vaults on commercial or industrial properties) are also engaging in privy digging. Privies are also called pits, holes, and chambers. In some locations, like New York City, vaults are sometimes referred to as “wells”, due to their appearance and often considerable depth. In these instances well digging is synonymous with privy digging.

== Academic controversies ==
There are controversies regarding who should be permitted to investigate private residential privies and the historical significance of what is found in them. From a conventional academic perspective, it is assumed that all privies contain vital and unique information which cannot be found elsewhere and that a costly forensic approach is required. Privy diggers who are not professional archaeologists are labeled “looters”, even while working on sites which are in the process of being destroyed or have already been examined and worked by archaeologists. While both parties are engaging in similar activities, each is confronted with very different logistics, constraints, and unique opportunities for genuine discovery.

U.S. academics responding to the threat of privy digging, dump digging, metal detecting, and so on have helped create laws protecting objects of a certain age, usually only 50–100 years old, from exploitation by opportunistic looters and other thieves that disturb historic context in pursuit of treasure. Laws intended to safeguard legitimate national and cultural treasures are applied to any item found while digging.

== Privies ==
Privies can be constructed of stone, brick, or wood and vary considerably from place to place. Some privy vaults are less than 2 feet deep and others are more than 25 feet. They can be as narrow as 2 feet or as wide as 10 feet, particularly in urban settings where a large privy shed with multiple doors and inner compartments once stood. Some vaults are cylindrical, these are usually made of stone or brick. Though there are cylindrical privies that are actually wooden barrels placed in the ground. Others are rectangular and commonly made of stone, brick, or wood. Many shallower rectangular vaults were only wood-lined.

Many privies were cleaned out periodically (“dipped”). This routine process addressed the growing concern for foul odors and airborne illnesses which were prevalent at the time. Dipping also provided some of the necessary organic material for the fertilizer industry. Around the time that modern plumbing was installed, many were cleaned out and backfilled with newer material. These dipped vaults do not have an undisturbed night soil layer and the probability of one containing anything of major archaeological importance is extremely low.

== Sites ==
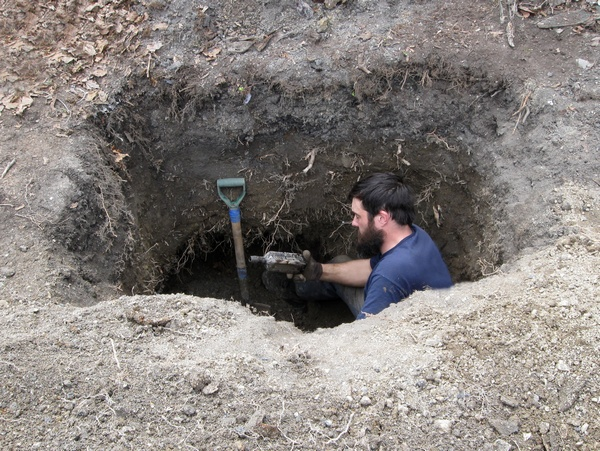
Excavating a small wood-lined privy located behind a residence which was built around 1876.

Most privies are located behind the building or buildings which they served. In major urban areas, such as older cities on the US east coast, they are commonly found in the rear section of the residential lot and their size will vary considerably from place to place. Old fire insurance maps, such as Sanborn, indicate that some properties were several lots wide and sometimes had two or more houses within the same boundary line. In these instances only one privy vault may exist for all the houses being considered or one may exist for each.

In other cases structures apparently had no outlying property at all. It is assumed that these particular vaults were incorporated into a neighboring lot or perhaps placed within the structure itself somewhere, possibly the basement. Some insurance maps show outbuildings and sheds, and occasionally privy outlines too. For example, 19th century insurance maps for New York City generally do not have markings indicating privy placements and some for New Jersey do. However, when researching the latter, privy diggers find no evidence that a privy ever existed where the map outline indicates one should be.

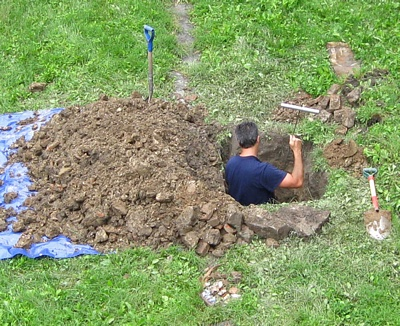
Investigating a barren wood-lined privy (c. 1840).

Some privy diggers also research excavation sites where old houses and other buildings, such as factories, saloons, and hotels once were. The use of heavy machinery can lead to indications of stone or brick structures and other subterranean anomalies being unearthed. This in turn can lead to discoveries of privies, cisterns, root cellars, and trash pits. Managers and owners of construction sites may not accommodate privy diggers on their missions to salvage on these sites.

Some of them are enthusiasts themselves and agreements can be formed allowing diggers to search for privy vaults and landfill deposits. Some historical diggers focus exclusively on these kinds of sites and over time develop good relations with various development companies. Permission to salvage on these sites can lead to remarkable discoveries with relatively little physical effort but this is the exception to the rule.

== Locating the privy vault ==
When a property is determined to be old enough to have had an outhouse somewhere within its original boundaries, probing and test digging are the common methods for finding it. The basic probe is made of spring steel and between 4’ and 6’ in length. Many variations exist and each locale being probed has its own peculiarities regarding which equipment and what techniques should be applied. Adept privy diggers develop considerable skill interpreting the faint residues which come up on the end of a probe and the subtle noise variations encountered while sliding it in and out of the ground.

Test digging involves making a small hole, and going down a few feet, to determine that a probe reading is accurate. Once something other than dirt and rocks are being encountered and man-made objects are buried deeply in a particular spot, the outline of the privy is carefully excavated. This can take hours or days depending on its size and the materials being dug through. Dug dirt or “fluff” as it is sometimes called, is systematically removed from the hole by shoveling. Deeper holes require a rope and bucket setup and sometimes a tripod mechanism to assist with the removal of material.

== Privy maintenance and garbage disposal ==
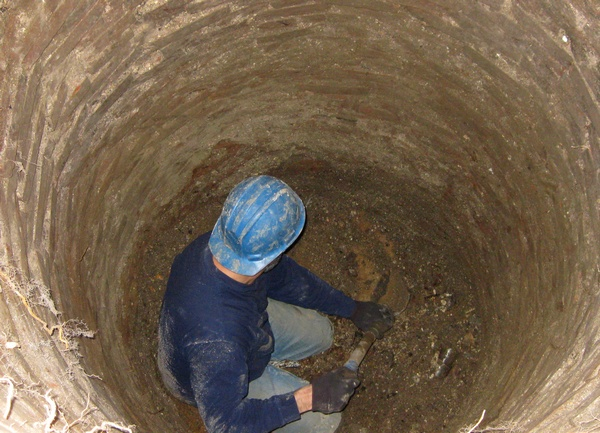
Near the bottom of a brick-lined urban privy awaiting demolition (c. 1855). During the salvage dig excavators encountered an array of antique bottles and other interesting items which were manufactured in the 1850s, 1860s and 1870s.

Due to extreme odors and overfilling, a high percentage of privy vaults were cleaned out, to varying levels, while still in use. This is commonly referred to as “dipping” among privy diggers. The amount of dipping that occurred, how far down a well material was cleared and how frequently it was cleared, varied from privy to privy. After plumbing was installed at the residence there was a final cleaning, which had a tendency of removing everything down to the deepest level of the vault.

Even at depths reaching 30 feet or more, some of the deepest vaults known to exist, many were cleaned to the base. Alternatively, a small percentage of shallow vaults extending down about 3 feet or less have contained noteworthy bottles, numerous fragments of dinner plates, cups, bowls, pitchers, tobacco pipes, clam and oyster shells, food bones and even sparse night soil pockets around the edges.

During the mid 19th century operators connected to the booming waste-generated fertilizer (night soil) business circulated cities and towns emptying vaults. In rural areas where vaults are usually much smaller and shallower farmers and other property owners often conducted this task themselves. Despite lying in human waste and other decaying refuse for years, many recyclable bottles of the time, and other reusable items, were retrieved during the dipping process. Genuine garbage would be taken to landfills and other suitable locations and dumped, along with a never ending supply of stove and fireplace ashes.

The evidence suggests that not all dippers were equally concerned with being meticulous and periodically dozens of bottles, and even some night soil, can still be found while privy digging. The many out of place bottles sometimes discovered in clusters near the top or bottom of a dipped out vault are referred to by diggers as “kick-backs”, or “throw-ins”, and were left intentionally by the workers who cleaned out the privy.

Throughout the decades of the middle and late 19th century, the years diggers tend to focus on due to rapid changes in bottle manufacturing, privies were only incidental or sporadic dumping spots for bottles, kitchen garbage and other refuse. Some privies were never used for that purpose at all and for practical reasons only a very small percentage of a household’s total trash could ever be distributed there. Due to the enormous quantities of everyday garbage being produced by this time in history, not to mention the hundreds of millions of bottles sold each year in the United States alone, the vaults would have filled up very quickly requiring constant maintenance instead of being emptied just every so often.

Moreover, it was generally acceptable to dump reeking trash just about anywhere then without worrying about legal consequences. Preferred places were lowland areas near the edges of towns and cities, down embankments and into ravines, rivers, streams, lakes, ponds, bogs, shorelines, backyard burning pits and other locales. For example, New York City sent scows brimming with garbage out into the harbor everyday where very cheap labor shoveled it directly into the water without a second thought. This process went on for centuries and an endless supply of collectable items, antiques and archaeological information alike remain in these dumping places to this day.

A sterile mixture of dirt, sand, rocks, ashes, brick bats and other worthless debris manufactured around 1880–1920 was used to backfill privies once plumbing was installed at a particular address. With or without night soil deposits remaining down below there is no longer any offensive odor.

== Items recovered ==
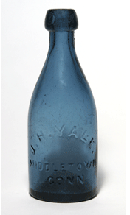
An iron pontiled soda or beer bottle, c. 1855.

Privy digging is directly linked to antique bottle collecting. Glass or clay bottles are the most likely items to be found in an average 19th century privy. Yet, more often than not they are found prohibitively damaged. This may be due to the large number of brickbats and stones which are found at all levels of the privy. Excavators have theorized that at least some of them were thrown in with the intention of crushing down the contents of the vault, so it could be used longer without needing to be cleaned. The high percentage of broken items is one reason why privy digging is one of the most unpredictable and arduous methods of attempting to form a bottle collection.

Pontiled medicine bottles, ink bottles, beer and soda bottles, and many others, particularly those manufactured between the 1830s-1860s are among the most sought after and can sell for thousands of dollars each. However, in reality an average pontiled find discovered while privy digging is worth less than twenty dollars. Even these are not discovered consistently in most locations.

Not unlike old stamps and coins invariably they are required to be in mint or very good condition to be sufficiently interesting to a serious bottle collector. An enormous quantity of rare bottles are known to exist in private collections, museums, and university basements, and elsewhere but these prime examples are seldom found on average privy digs. In fact a high percentage of all valuable bottles and related containers were never buried in privies, dumps or elsewhere; these are known as “attic” bottles among privy diggers and bottle collectors.

There are exceptions and over time some groups of regularly active diggers, operating in good locations, will encounter thousands of antique bottles and other artifacts. The vast majority of items will be very common examples of nominal value, unlikely to be of use to serious collectors, historians, or archaeologists.

Not unlike dump diggers privy diggers may also encounter miscellaneous tableware (banded ware, redware, mocha, and other slipwares), stoneware, occasionally clay pipes, doll parts, tea set pieces, marbles, buttons, chamber pots, decorative porcelain pot lids and bases used for pomades and skin creams, bone or ivory toothbrush handles, hard-rubber combs and hair picks, ambrotypes, and other objects which are usually broken or damaged.

Most of these items were valueless and intentionally discarded into the privy, others fell through the opening in the outhouse seat, and some were lost at the hands of small children. In each instance the insides of active vaults were very caustic environments, the highly toxic ingredients causing most things to break down and rot very quickly.

== Related topics and history ==
Privy diggers, along with dump diggers and other historical diggers are enthusiastic about making their own discoveries and will get sufficiently dirty as a result. Though there are some exceptions this work is usually done by hand and requires a remarkable degree of persistence and tenacity. Career level diggers are obsessive by nature, sometimes achieving considerable skill with the various forms of privy digging techniques available. Some privy diggers also use a metal detector to pinpoint old coins and other easy to miss metal objects. Some privy diggers are metal detectorists and some metal detectorists are also privy diggers, dump diggers and so on. However, each designation is a specific subject on its own.

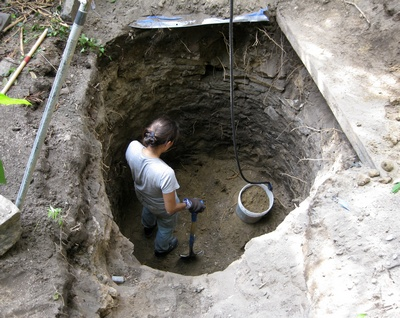
Excavating a large stone-lined urban privy during a major property renovation (c. 1851).

In 2015, Melissa and Matthew Dunphy discovered 2 privies while renovating a former magic theater that they had just purchased in Old City, Philadelphia. The first privy was only 6 feet deep, while the second extended 19 and a half feet. During the excavation they found thousands of pieces of broken ceramics, bottles, and animals bones with some of the items dating back to the 1700s. The couple has a podcast titled The Boghouse, where they talk about their privy-digging experiences. Melissa Dunphy has also written an opera titled Alice Tierney based on their experiences as citizen archeologists. They opera tells the story of a woman who died under mysterious circumstances on her property in 1880.

Privy digging has things in common with dump digging, and to some degree treasure hunting and garbology, but is none of these exclusively, as it involves salvaging the contents of defunct privies more than anything else. Privy digging and dump digging are equally concerned with antique bottles and related items. Though many exceptions exist in most instances even the oldest dump-bottles are not as old as privy bottles can be.

Dumps are commonly associated with bottles and trash manufactured between the 1880s-1920s. This was a time when everyday bottles were being mass-produced annually by the hundreds of millions. They were reused less and often thrown away rather than recycled due to their relatively inexpensive production costs.

Many bottles were still being mouth-blown and their lips formed by assorted tooling devices as late as 1915-20. The patent for the first fully automatic bottle machine, the Owens Automatic Bottle Machine, was not issued until 1903. And by 1906 it was swiftly replacing the old method at glasshouses nationwide. Early examples of machine made bottles manufactured between about 1906 and 1915 often resemble their predecessors in shape and color and can be nominally valuable for that reason.

Whether found in privies or dumps late period mouth-blown bottles manufactured between about 1880-1915 have a lesser amount of serious collectable potential depending on rarity, condition and color. Dug bottles manufactured between 1880 and 1915 have sold for hundreds or even thousands of dollars but statistically this is very rare.

Although privy diggers usually attempt to focus on the contents of vaults built before the Civil War, these too can also contain bottles made as late as the 1920s or later up near the top. Depending on when a vault went into permanent disuse it could contain bottles and debris deposited as late as the second half of the 20th century. According to a 1950 census 50 million homes reported no indoor plumbing. In 1990 more than four million old style privies were still in use coast to coast. No matter what is encountered near the top assuming a given vault was active in 1850 its potential for older bottles lying at a lower section has a consistently strong draw for serious privy diggers.

Whether mold blown or free blown (both forms of mouth-blowing and considered hand made), most bottles produced before 1860-65 have a distinct scar on their base. This mark is the result of removing the pontil rod. Something which was temporarily fused to the base in order to handle them effectively while they were still exceedingly hot, as their necks and lips were being tooled at the glassworks. The decades just prior to the absence of pontil rods from bottle-glass making were a time when endless variations pertaining to shape, size, style, color and embossing were being produced regularly in an unprecedented quantity. Some of the most interesting bottles were manufactured during this time; 1830s-1860s.

Even after the pontil rod was replaced by assorted clamping mechanisms known as “snap cases”, many bottles were still being created in the same interesting molds and sold in huge quantities annually. These are known as smooth base bottles and are sometimes found in privies which were in use after the 1860s and as late as the 1880s. Visually, the difference between an early smooth base and a pontiled example of exactly the same bottle is insignificant but to a collector it often means everything. Rare early smooth base bottles can occasionally be as valuable as rare pontiled bottles but statistically they are unlikely to be discovered with any regularity on average privy digs.

== See also ==
- Bottles
- Dump digging
- Historical digging
- Nightsoil
- Outhouse
- Sanitation

== General and cited references ==
- Barlow, Ronald S. (1992). The Vanishing American Outhouse: A History of Country Plumbing. El Cajon, Calif.: Windmill Publishing Company. OCLC 28828028.
- Jordan, S. (2010). Past Objects. Photographer: J. K. Putnam. New York: Mark Batty Publisher.
- Miller, B. (2000). Fat of the Land: Garbage in New York—The Last Two Hundred Years. New York: Basic Books.
- Rickard, J. (2006). Mocha and related dipped wares, 1770–1939. New York: University Press of New England.
