= Garbology =

Study of modern refuse

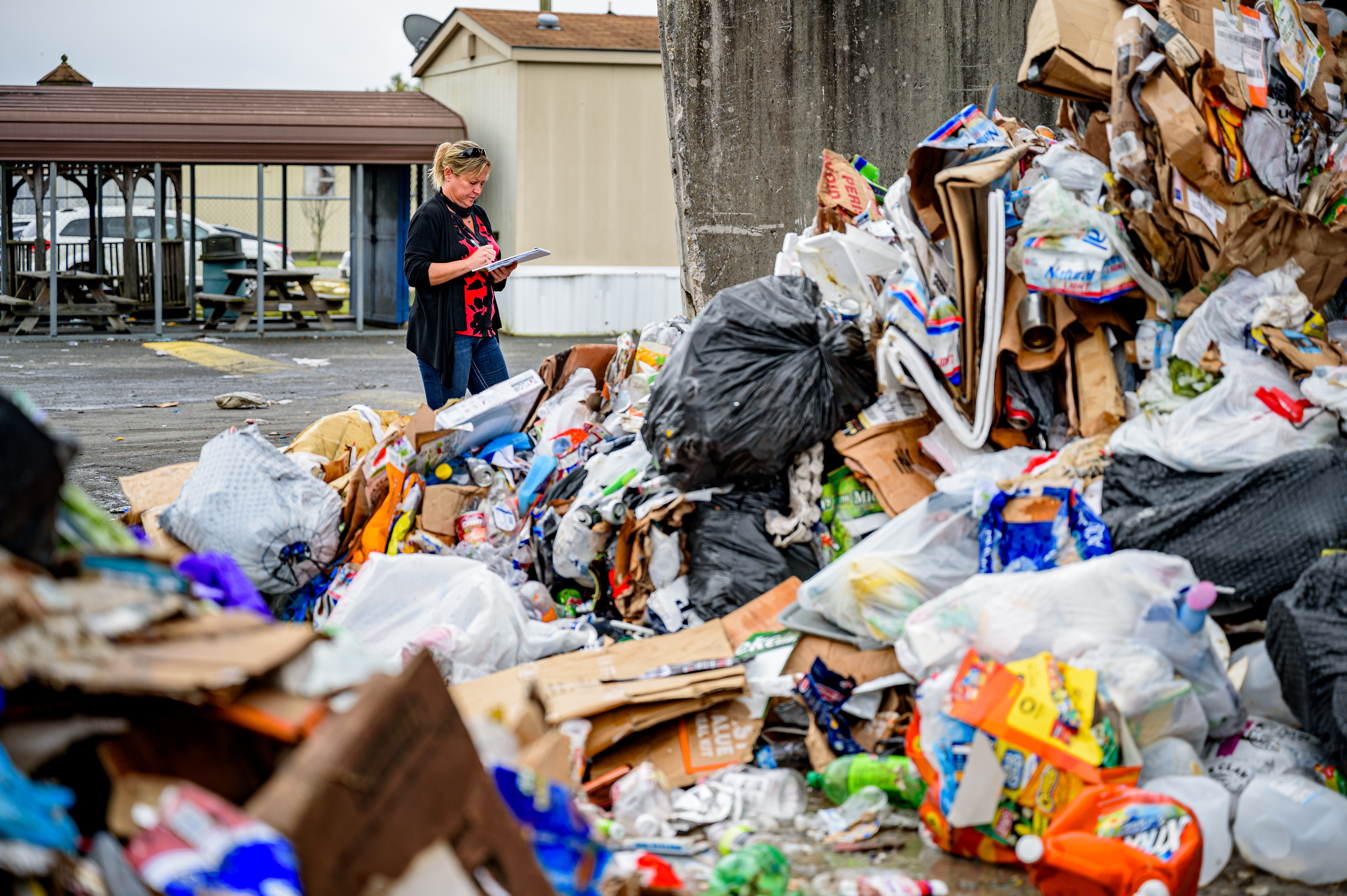
A public works employee analyzing collected recycling as part of a waste characterisation study

Garbology is the study of modern garbage, especially post-consumer waste, in the fields of archeology and environmental science. Garbology is also the practice of searching for information in discarded materials as part of an investigation, including dumpster diving conducted by journalists, hackers, activists, and private investigators.

As a sub-field of anthropology and contemporary archeology, garbology involves studying behaviors and practices related to waste management and landfills to better understand human cultures and reduce environmental issues. It was pioneered by William Rathje at the University of Arizona in 1973. The Tucson Garbage Project studied the contents of residential waste and people's perceptions of waste, including identifying misconceptions about the contents of landfills. In environmental science education, influenced by Rathje's work, garbology includes teaching about waste minimisation and conducting waste characterisation activities.

The practice of searching for information in people's trash cans does not have a standardized name, but in 1971, American writer A. J. Weberman described his controversial practice of searching for scoops in celebrity trash cans as "garbage-ology", which influenced others to use the term garbology as well. This form of dumpster diving is also called "trashing" or "information diving". In British English, the practice is sometimes called "binology", especially when used to find information for tabloid journalism. As a law enforcement and intelligence agency practice, dating back to at least the 1950s, it is typically called a "trash cover", "trash pull", or "garbage pull".

The term "garbology" is also a humorous word for waste management in general, such as calling garbage collectors garbologists, first used in the 1960s.

== Archeology ==
=== Context ===
When conducted with archeological methods, garbology is a form of contemporary archeology and behavioral archeology. Archeology includes the study of garbage because trash is part of material culture, a rich source of information about people. Ancient garbage in middens and other deposits provides important insights into the daily lives and cultural practices of people in the past, including by studying food remains, pollen traces from plants, and broken tools.

=== Work at the University of Arizona ===
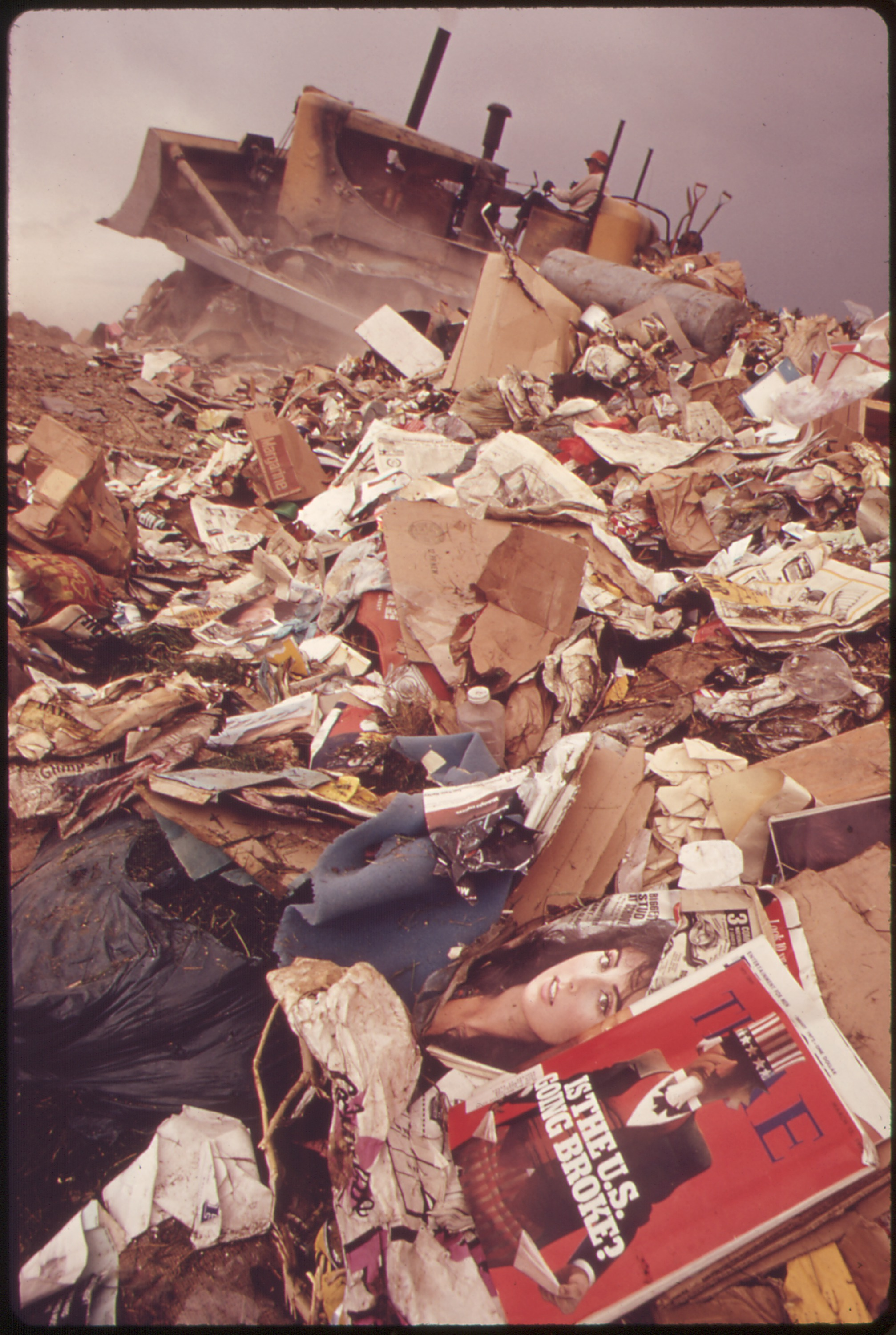
A landfill in Colorado in 1972

In the context of concerns about urban garbage and landfills in the United States in the early 1970s, during the growth of the modern environmental movement, University of Arizona archeology professor William Rathje became interested in comparing people's statements and behaviors related to garbage. He was inspired by student projects that studied local garbage as part of material culture, along with seeing an article by Weberman about "garbology". The Tucson Garbage Project began in 1973 with surveys of household garbage and expanded to include landfill excavation in 1987. Rathje published a book about garbage in 1992, Rubbish! The Archeology of Garbage, which included observations from the Tucson Garbage Project.

For example, Rathje and collaborators found that Americans had several misconceptions about the contents of municipal landfills. Based on their surveys in the 1980s, people believed that fast food containers, disposable diapers, and polystyrene foam took up at least 40% of the space in landfills, but these materials were under 5% of landfills by volume. On the other hand, landfills had more paper and construction and demolition waste than people expected. Rathje also found that material in landfills biodegrades much more slowly than projected.

To fund Garbage Project research, Rathje obtained government grants and set up contracts with companies such as Frito-Lay, Procter & Gamble, and Miller Brewing Company. Garbology research was followed by industries wishing to demonstrate that discards originating with their products are (or are not) important in the trash stream, and by municipalities wishing to learn whether some parts of the trash they collect has any salable value.

Garbage is not mathematics. To understand garbage you have to touch it, to feel it, to sort it, to smell it.

— William Rathje and Cullen Murphy, Rubbish!: The Archeology of Garbage

== Environmental science ==
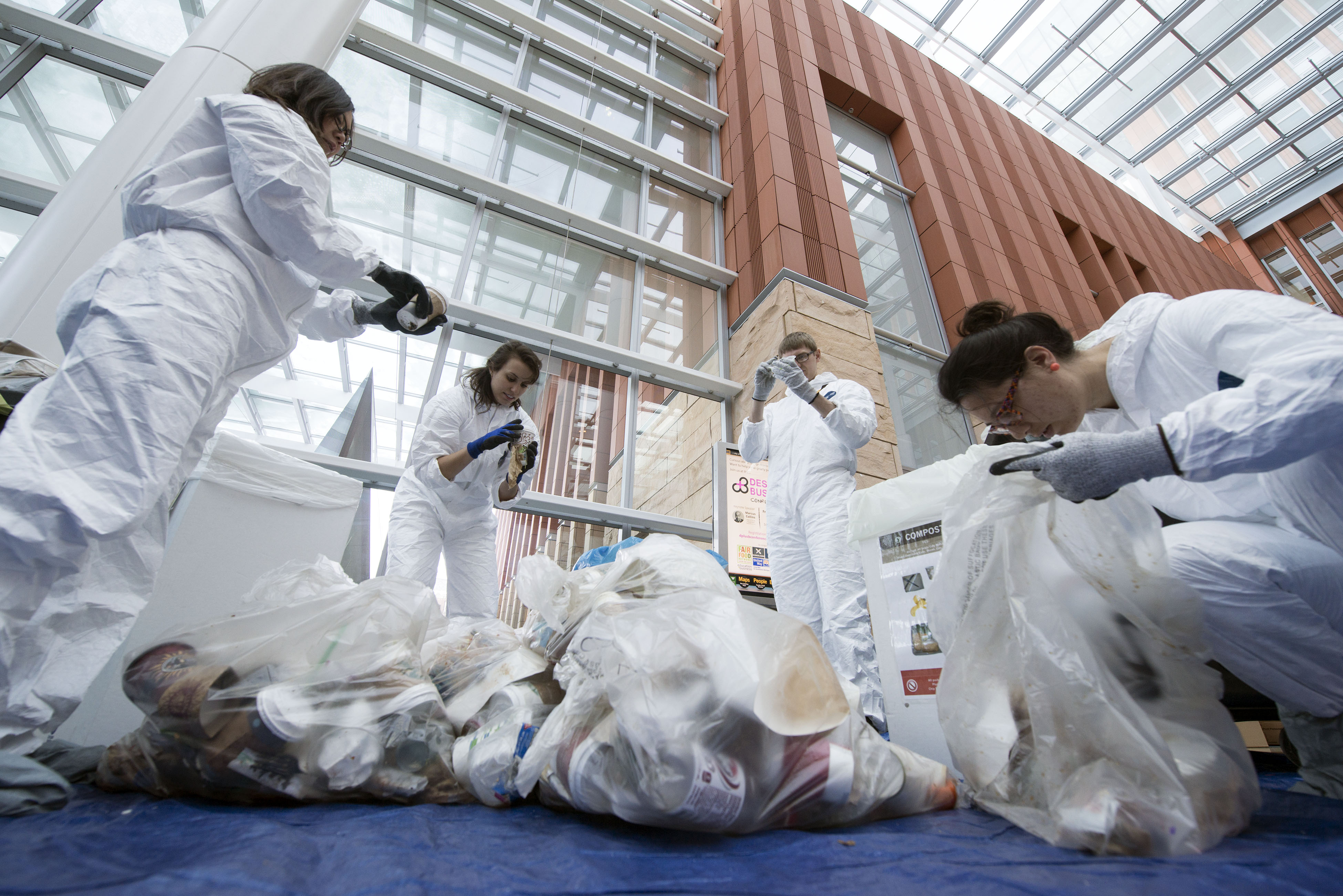
Students at the University of Michigan conducting a waste characterisation study

People teaching environmental science sometimes use the term garbology for studying waste and improving waste management. In 2007, the PAST Foundation developed a science curriculum for middle and high school students about waste reduction, recycling, and composting, inspired by Rathje's work, and named it "Garbology". Garbology activities in schools and universities include waste characterisation, where students sort and analyze a sample of trash from a building. Students evaluate the materials from the trash and identify how much could have been recycled. Garbology Kids, a series of books written by Sabbithry Persad, teaches children lessons about recycling and reusing materials. The title of the series was inspired by Rathje's work.

In a 2012 book, Garbology: Our Dirty Love Affair with Trash, journalist Edward Humes discussed the state of waste management, ranging from garbage patches in the ocean to municipal efforts to manage trash, such as the Puente Hills Landfill. He estimated that the average US citizen produces 102 tons of refuse in their lifetime. He noted that Portland, Oregon, was considering implementing anaerobic digesters and plasma gasification to efficiently decompose garbage. He also described the efficiency of waste management in Copenhagen, where a large quantity of garbage is incinerated in waste-to-energy plants and very little ends up in landfills.

The Lutheran retreat center of Holden Village, Washington, uses the term garbology for communal sorting, separating, and disposal of landfill, recycling, and compostable items. Holden hires a "garbologist" who manages the village's waste, including leading community members in waste sorting.

== Investigative uses ==
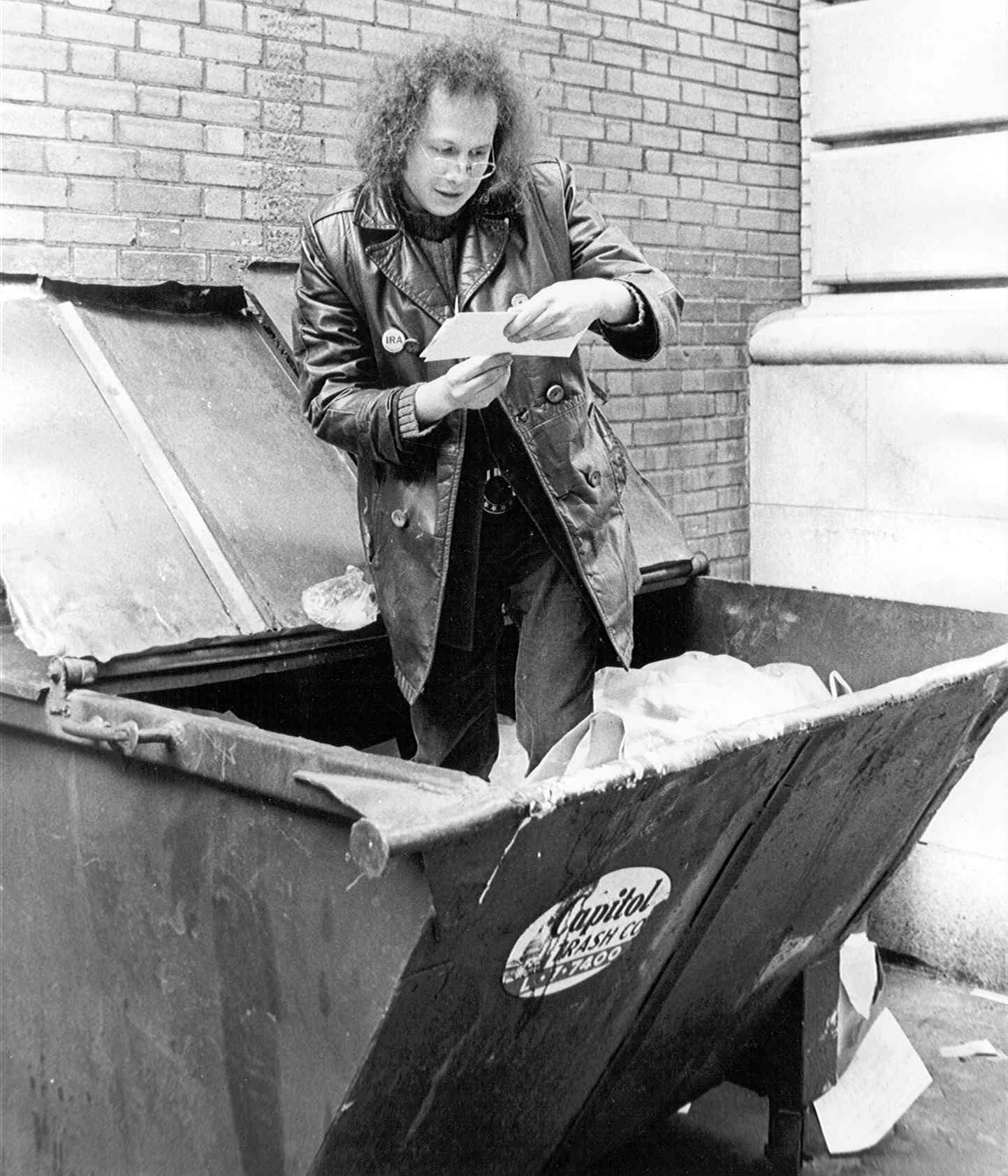
Weberman demonstrating garbology in the 1970s (photo by Chip Berlet)

A. J. Weberman popularized the word garbage-ology in 1971 in an Esquire cover story about searching through celebrity trash, including Bob Dylan's trash, for journalistic information. In this sense, garbology is an investigative tool for law enforcement, journalists, corporate espionage, private investigators, paparazzi, activists, historians, and other investigators. This not only includes physical sorting of papers from a rubbish bin but also analysis of files found in a computer's recycle bin.

The FBI ran "trash covers" against various organizations deemed subversive in the early 1950s and has continued to use them for some investigations, such as in 1993 to gather evidence against Aldrich Ames. In the 1990s, the Trinity Foundation found evidence in dumpsters that the organization of the crooked televangelist Robert Tilton discarded prayer requests it received after removing the money inside. Investigator Benjamin Pell sold information gleaned from paperwork in prominent people's garbage to the British press in the 1990s. In British English, this practice is called "binology".

Starting in the mid-1970s and 1980s, phone phreaks and computer hackers used dumpster diving, which they called garbology or "trashing", as a strategy to find system manuals and other information for social engineering and circumventing security measures. Early hackers including the Masters of Deception and Susan Headley used this method to learn about telephone company systems. In Weberman's 1980 book My Life in Garbology, he tells the story of Jerry Neil Schneider, who scavenged documents from Pacific Bell dumpsters that helped him fraudulently obtain equipment from the company in the early 1970s.

Protection against unauthorized extraction of information from discarded materials, such as using paper shredders and destroying hard drives before disposal, remains part of physical information security. For example, in the early 2000s, two MIT graduate students were able to obtain credit card information and tax return data from secondhand hard drives due to inadequate data erasure. At electronic waste recycling sites, scam artists may try to extract passwords and other personal data from discarded hard drives to use for credit card fraud and identity theft.

The Supreme Court found in California v. Greenwood (1988) that warrantless search of garbage set out for disposal was not against the Fourth Amendment, allowing law enforcement use of "trash pulls" and "garbage pulls". Many counties and cities in the United States have ordinances against unauthorized retrieval of materials from trash, considering it trespassing or garbage theft.

== See also ==
- Atari video game burial, which was observed by archeologists
- Dump digging
- Operation Tamarisk
