= Waste characterisation =

Analysis of waste streams

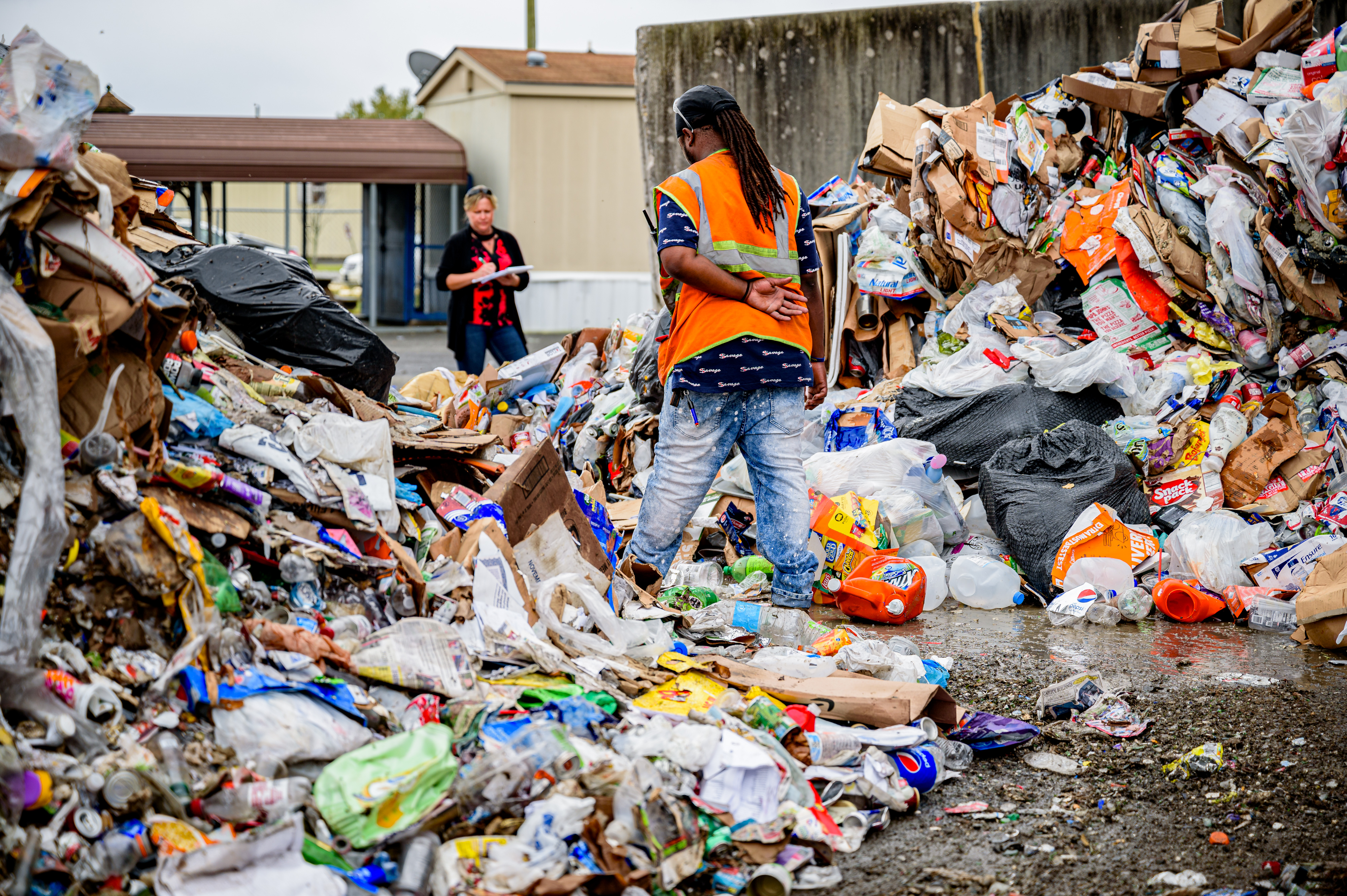
Public works employees analyzing collected recycling in Greenville, North Carolina to prioritize contamination issues to address through educational campaigns

Waste characterisation (or waste characterization in the United States), also called waste stream analysis, waste assessment, or a waste audit, is the process of separating and analysing the components of a waste stream. Waste characterisation supports efforts to improve waste management, such as evaluating the effectiveness of waste sorting programs and identifying opportunities for improving recycling. For example, analyzing the composition of biodegradable waste in a waste stream is vital in systems such as composting or anaerobic digestion.

Waste characterisation studies may be conducted at different scales by waste management companies, local governments, and private companies and organizations.

== Process ==
Waste characterisation is a manual process. For example, at a waste management plant, it may consist of taking a tonne from a garbage truck, dividing the sample into four parts, mixing them, dividing again into four parts, and taking one of them (250 kg) to analyze manually. This process takes around 3–4 hours to complete and generally involves 2-4 people.

Even if this process is carried out very frequently (usually every 2 or 3 days), it is only a sample of the waste composition. Solid material waste is classified in material recovery facilities with mechanical tools (magnetic for metal, air pumps for plastic films, ramps for rolling objects, etc.), and the contents of the garbage truck are unknown until the process takes place.

Some universities and schools involve students in waste characterisation studies as educational activities, sometimes called "garbology".

A typical set of categories for waste characterisation are: paper and paperboard, glass, metal, plastic, textiles, organics, construction and demolition (C &D), special care, and other.

Municipal solid waste may be broken down further into: film plastic (LDPE), dense plastic (HDPE, PET), ferrous metal, non-ferrous metals, glass, textiles, paper and cardboard, garden waste or green waste, fines (items below a certain screen size), food, and other.

== European Waste Catalogue ==
The European Waste Catalogue (EWC) refers to a set (non-exhaustive) list of wastes from households and businesses inside the European Union. The EWC is a code (six numbers in three sets of two) that adequately describes the waste transported, handled, or treated. The EWC is where Duty of Care Notices or Waste Transfer Notes are passed between waste management companies and waste carriers to report volumes received or treated back to the governing agency (such as the Environment Agency in England and Wales, Scottish Environmental Protection Agency (SEPA) in Scotland, Northern Ireland (NI) Environment Agency, etc.).

=== Waste characterisation and reporting ===
The first step in characterising waste is to decide on the appropriate EWC code. These codes carry three categories - absolute non-hazardous, mirror entries, and absolute hazardous. The initial assessment for the majority of wastes follows a simple derivation of industry (twenty main categories) from which they were obtained (agricultural, woodworking (furniture), electronics, etc.). Each derived section is denoted by the first two sets of two numbers, referring to a particular industry or sector. The final set of two numbers relates directly to the waste. The waste is hazardous by its very composition. An asterisk follows behind the EWC.

Each member state's Environment Agency throughout the European Union must adopt the EWC in its reporting methods and enforce its use by the respective waste management sector. The lists are available through the European Commission's website. Submissions by Waste Management Companies to their respective member states' Environmental Agencies are collated, in many instances, by conversion to EWC STAT (European Waste Catalogue for Statistics) for submission to the EU, which oversees all member states and ensures compliance with unilaterally agreed standards and recycling rates.

=== Waste entries ===
Waste entries are hazardous, not by the composition of the waste, but by virtue of the process that produced it. The same is true for non-hazardous absolute entries. Mirror entries can be hazardous or non-hazardous, depending on the waste composition.

Deciding whether a mirror entry is hazardous or non-hazardous by composition involves the usage of the Approved Supply List (ASL). A substance not listed in the ASL permits other sources, such as Manufacturer's Safety Data Sheets (MSDS), to classify the waste. These documents contain "Risk Phrase," which describes the hazards that the substance or substances present. Risk phrases have threshold values that indicate what concentration of a substance must be present for the waste to be classified as hazardous by the Hazard Code attached to the Risk Phrase.

== See also ==
- List of waste treatment technologies
