= Standing Bear High School =

High school in Lincoln, Nebraska

Location
- 11100 S 70th St. Lincoln, Nebraska; United States; 40°42′04″N 96°37′22″W

Information
- Type: Public
- Established: August 14, 2023; 3 years ago
- School district: Lincoln Public Schools
- Principal: Susan Cassata
- Grades: 9–12
- Enrollment: 631 (2024–2025)
- Campus type: Suburban
- Colors: Charcoal, Carolina blue, and navy blue
- Mascot: Grizzly bear
- Nickname: Grizzlies
- Website: lsb.lps.org

Standing Bear High School is a public high school in Lincoln, Nebraska. It opened in 2023 and is part of the Lincoln Public Schools system. The school is named after Ponca chief and civil rights activist Standing Bear.

== History ==
Standing Bear High School was constructed in response to rapid population growth in Lincoln and the need to reduce overcrowding in existing high schools. It opened alongside Lincoln Northwest High School as part of an expansion of the district.

The school officially opened on August 14, 2023, initially serving only underclassmen (freshmen and sophomores) with plans to expand to full enrollment as additional grade levels are added each year.

Construction began in 2021, with a groundbreaking ceremony attended by members of the Ponca Tribe and descendants of the school's namesake. Susan Cassata serves as the school's first principal.

== Namesake ==
The school is named after Standing Bear, a 19th-century Ponca leader known for his role in a landmark civil rights case.

In 1879, Standing Bear successfully argued in U.S. court that Native Americans are "persons" under the law, a major step forward in Indigenous civil rights.

The naming of the school reflects an effort by Lincoln Public Schools to honor Indigenous history and recognize the cultural significance of Standing Bear’s legacy.

== Athletics ==
Standing Bear sponsors 21 varsity sports programs and competes in the Class A division of the Nebraska School Activities Association. The school hired former National Football League tight end Adam Schiltz as the first head football coach.

The school went to class A in the 2026/2027 school year. They are a part of the Heartland Athletic Conference.

== Campus and facilities ==
The campus is located in the southern portion of Lincoln and features modern facilities, including classrooms, athletic spaces, and common areas designed to support collaborative learning. This includes openable garage doors added to classrooms and an area named the Learning Stairs.

As one of the newest high schools in the district, the building incorporates updated educational design and technology.

The school plans to expand as enrollment grows.

== Role within Lincoln Public Schools ==
Standing Bear High School is one of several high schools in Lincoln Public Schools, joining others such as Lincoln High School and additional district campuses.

It is notable for being one of the few non-directionally named high schools in the district.
