= Jerry Neil Schneider =

American computer security consultant (born 1951)

Jerry Neil Schneider (born circa 1951) is a social engineer and security consultant. While still in high school in 1968, Schneider started a company called "Creative Systems Enterprises" (CSE) and began selling his own invented electronic communication devices. Schneider obtained parts by information diving from Pacific Telephone and Telegraph's dumpsters. During this scavenging, he built up a collection of PTT documents including invoices and training manuals. After a few years, he reportedly knew more about PTT's procedures than its own employees.

1970–1971: Schneider expanded his telephone wholesale business while majoring in Electrical Engineering in college.

June, 1971: Schneider started a plan to acquire new telephone equipment from PTT, market it as "refurbished," and sell it through CSE, his own company. The exact details of his scam are currently not available, but he did have a van with Pacific Bell logo that he kept in his mom's garage. He also acquired equipment from Western Electric Company in a similar manner. He sold equipment back to Pacific and to others.

January, 1972: A former employee of CSE (refused a raise from $11/hour to $13/hour) tips off law enforcement. Police raid CSE's offices and warehouse. The District Attorney estimates the found equipment is worth $8,000. At this time, they learn that Schneider had made off with $125,000 worth of gear. Schneider later admits to nearly $900,000.

He was arrested on February 8, 1972. Contemporary sources rate his caper as one of the most famous computer crimes in history.

After plea bargaining, Schneider eventually pleaded guilty on May 15, 1972 to one count of grand theft of $5,000 worth of equipment. In July 1972, he was sentenced to two months in a minimum security facility. He only served forty days and paid a $500 fine.

1972: Schneider, at 21, formed a security consultancy that targeted companies wishing to protect themselves from computer criminals.

November 26, 1974: Date of final judgement of civil suit from PTT. Suit stated that Schneider had stolen equipment valued at $214,649.63, and that equipment valued at $73,452.81 had been returned.

1977: Schneider left the security consulting firm.
