= PAST Foundation =

American federal non-profit organization

The PAST Foundation
- Formation: 2000
- Headquarters: Columbus, OH, U.S.
- Website: http://www.pastfoundation.org

The PAST Foundation, Partnering Anthropology with Science and Technology. PAST is a federal 501(c)(3) non-profit educational and research team located in the United States that builds partnerships around compelling scientific and educational projects, making them accessible to students and the public through transdisciplinary program-based learning, experiential field schools, documentary film, and interactive websites.

== History ==
The PAST Foundation was founded in 2000 by an ad hoc organization of anthropologists and scientists who were determined to make ongoing scientific research across a broad spectrum of professions accessible to the public. Immediately, the PAST team began building partnerships and programs for seamless education. The initial work in 2001 included a partnership with the Zoo School from Lincoln, Nebraska, Yellowstone National Park, and PAST. The year-long program featured the first Thermal River archaeological investigation on the Marshall Hotel in the Firehole River and culminated in a published book on the archaeology of the site garnering PAST the National Park Service John L. Cotter Award for Excellence in American Archaeology.

For the next five years, PAST continued to partner with both public and private organizations building educational programs like Riverboatin' on the Red for Oklahoma's Department of Education and SCRUNCH for the US Minerals Management Service. Both programs pivoted around ongoing research such as the discovery of a shipwreck in the Red River dating to Oklahoma's early 19th century settlement period and the effects of pressure on Styrofoam cups that were taken down on the AUV (Autonomous Underwater Vehicle) that studied World War II shipwrecks in thousands of feet of water in the Gulf of Mexico. These program-based learning projects that crossed disciplines have become the cornerstone of PAST.

In addition, PAST continued to partner with public agencies, universities, businesses, and industry building adult field study programs, anthropological research projects, and interactive websites. Years after their launch, websites for the Deep Wrecks Project and USS Arizona still have high volume visitation. The adult field schools have partnered with the Ohio State University, California State Parks, the Florida Keys National Marine Sanctuary, Nebraska Wesleyan University, Oklahoma Historical Society, Indiana University, and East Carolina University providing participants with rigorous field experience and the partners with published reports and searchable databases.

=== Transition ===
In 2005, through a startup donation, PAST transitioned from a loose knit project driven organization to a program-based non-profit. Additionally, PAST moved the main office to Columbus, Ohio centrally located within the United States. The move allowed PAST to strategically address the organization's growth. Continuously on the quest to partner with schools to pilot PAST programs, in 2006 the foundation formed a partnership with the Ohio State University, the Battelle Memorial Institute, the Central Ohio Educational Council, and the innovative STEM (Science, Technology, Engineering, and Math) and Metro Early College and Demonstration High School, located on the OSU campus. Forming the PAST/Metro Program Design Center, PAST set about working with the high school faculty to design transdisciplinary programs that pivot on global issues. The very first program, Garbology, built on the work of Dr. William Rathje of the Stanford University Archaeology Center and pivoted on the very real, global issues of waste management, drew national attention and was rewarded the Emerald Award for Excellence in Environmental Education. The students, the program, and the project director, Dr. Sheli O. Smith, were bestowed with this award.

Employing STEM as a delivery vehicle for education, PAST has continued to build widespread programs that encourage students and allow teachers and students to participate in education. From Forensics in the Classroom to The Cultural Landscape of a Michigan Ghost Town, from The Web of Life to Get Real, from Marine Ecology of the Florida Keys to Growing America, the PAST programs continue to draw on the anthropological base of the organization and to building learning.

Utilizing the guidance of a strategic plan, PAST has been able to also grow on several other fronts. The PAST adult field schools, now in their ninth year, continue to study known archaeological sites and collections assisting public agencies in better understanding, interpretation, and protection of America's maritime heritage treasures, as well as forging ahead in areas of anthropology. PAST field schools helped California Parks move forward in nominating the Gold Rush Era, shipwreck, Frolic on the Mendocino Coast for inclusion in California's State Underwater Parks. The 2005 through 2008 field schools assisted the Florida Keys National Marine Sanctuary in better understanding and interpreting the 19th century, Sanctuary shipwrecks, Slobodna, Tonawanda, and Memanon Sanford. Since 2006, PAST and partners have hosted a summer field program dedicated to allowing students to fully explore the world of Forensic Anthropology. Similarly, PAST partnered with the respected documentary film program at Montana State University to offer teachers and students a summer practicum in documentary filmmaking that embeds the process in scientific projects.

In 2006, PAST sought out a new avenue of public access in order to bring the educational programs and field work and research to the public. PAST Publications utilizes the print-on-demand process to enable students, professionals, programs, and organizations to publish scientific and educational work in a timely and cost-effective way.

In 2007, after a year of working with STEM educational reform, PAST and the Battelle Center for Mathematics and Science Education Policy embarked on a combined, ethnographic and policy network study of STEM at Metro Early College and Demonstration High School. The interdisciplinary approach and findings of the study have added a new dimension to the national consideration of how STEM is developed.

=== Growth ===
Closing in on its first decade of operation, the PAST Foundation continues to be dedicated to the original goal of bringing public access to compelling scientific research. Currently, PAST works with emerging STEM schools across the US to build transdisciplinary programs for K-20 education and to better understand through anthropological ethnography, the underlying systems that make STEM successful. PAST continues to build learning programs for both high school age students and adults. The impact of these programs help drive their success. PAST Publications is also growing, helping graduate students publish their theses and academic institutions maintain the tradition of publishing research in a timely manner.

=== Awards ===
Since its establishment in 2000, recognition of PAST's achievements have steadily accumulated. PAST was honored the 2001 National Park Service Cotter Award for Excellence in Archaeology, the 2007 Wiley Award for Excellence in Documentary Film, the 2007 Secretary of the Interior's Conservation Collaborative Partnership Award, the 2007 National Oceanic Partner's Program Award, the 2007 Emerald Award for Excellence in Environmental Education, and the 2007 Ohio State University Kellogg Award for Excellence in Experiential Learning.

Individually, the PAST research team and its research associates have garnered Emmy Awards, the Society of Historical Archaeology's Cotter Award for New Promising Professional, and the Ohio State University's Graduate Student of the Year Award.

== Partnerships ==
The PAST Foundation seeks partnerships for ongoing program-based learning opportunities, field programs, documentary film programs, and publications. It is PAST's contention that strong public networks ensure robust learning opportunities. Currently, PAST partners with public agencies, private businesses, public organizations, non-profit institutions, academic institutions, and industries in building programs, underwriting research, and furthering scientific endeavors. See Partnerships Below.

== Field schools ==
The PAST Foundation field schools consist of anthropological and scientific work that impact humans and their environment, culture, and heritage. All PAST field opportunities are structured as a course with an authentic learning product that benefits the community. Field studies include supervised training, introduction to scientific techniques and methods, as well as organized presentation of field study results. Students have the opportunity to acquire high school and college credit for the field study programs. Field schools currently include work in cultural landscapes, underwater archaeology, marine ecology, entomology, forensic anthropology, urban gardening, and documentary filmmaking.

Students are connected with professionals and researchers from around the world, both in-person and through the internet. All field programs explore real needs, engage community partners, and produce tangible outcomes that both assist the community partners and further the education of the participating students.

== Research ==
Ongoing research is also key in the organization's interests.

The PAST Foundation supports new research and methodologies in linking field projects and researchers with educational programs in the classroom. Through the PAST/Metro Program Design Center, graduate students build upon their graduate research creating programs that are ultimately published for public consumption. Forensics in the Classroom, the Web of Life, and Growing America are examples of ongoing, doctoral research that have been crafted into programs aimed at engaging young students in scientific methods and potential, lifelong careers.

Ongoing ethnographic studies of STEM are producing results intended to help schools better understand the universal structure that supports STEM delivery systems and how to successfully grow and sustain the necessary community and public networks that support it.

Research on the deepwater shipwrecks and other underwater archaeological sites have spurred the PAST research team to initiate a web driven database that will allow researchers from around the world to share and compare information regarding historic ship construction details. VirtualVessel.com, currently under construction, is planned for launch by the close of 2009.

== Publications ==
PAST Publications, initiated in 2006, recognizes that large quantities of anthropological research does not reach the public. It is the intention of PAST Publications to fill the niche for small-production printing of student theses and dissertations, special publications, cultural resource management (CRM) firm reports, educational programs, and field studies and research.

PAST Publications has a bookstore that is available through the foundation's website. Through partnerships with universities, professional organizations, CRM firms, and public agencies, the department now features an array of anthropological master's thesis, archaeological reports, manuals, journals, and proceedings.

Authors and organizations also seek methods of publishing and printing their work. The relatively new process of inline, on-demand printing allows production of one or more copies without changing the cost. All PAST Publications follow the Library of Congress protocol including ISBN numbers.
