= Waste management industry =

Companies involved in waste disposal

The waste management industry, or waste industry for short, includes all industrial branches involved in waste management, waste dumping, waste recycling, waste characterisation, and, to a lesser degree, waste prevention. The industry includes a large number of waste management companies, including multinational corporations.

On a global scale, the market size is expected to reach $530.0 billion by 2025 from $330.6 billion in 2017, with a compound annual growth rate of 6.0%. The growth might even continue when, according to a World Bank report, global waste production will grow by 70% from 2018 to 2050, unless severe measures are taken.

For example, within Germany, waste management has evolved into a large economic sector. There are more than 270,000 people working in some 11,000 companies with an annual turnover of around 70 billion euros (~$78 billion). More than 15,500 waste management facilities help to conserve resources through recycling and other recovery operations.

== Global players ==
Among the top companies in the sector are the following:

- Advanced Disposal Services
- Biffa
- Clean Harbors
- Reworld
- Hitachi Zosen Corporation
- Remondis
- Republic Services
- Suez Environment
- Veolia Environment
- Waste Management
