= Tucson Garbage Project =

1973 research project in Arizona

The Tucson Garbage Project is an archaeological and sociological study instituted in 1973 by Dr. William Rathje in the city of Tucson in the Southwestern American state of Arizona. This project is sometimes referred to as the "garbology project".

== History ==
Dr. Rathje (also known affectionately as "Captain Planet") and his students studied the contents of Tucson residents' waste to examine patterns of consumption. Quantitative data from bins was compared with information known about the residents who owned them. The results have shown that information people freely volunteered about their consumption habits did not always tally with the contents of their waste bins. For example, alcohol consumption was proven to be significantly higher in reality than in the questionnaires completed by the people studied. Such findings have highlighted the difference between people's self-reported and actual behaviors.

Such findings cast doubt on the reliability of historical record when applied to archaeological sites in general and follow a processualist approach stressing the benefits of scientific analysis.

The project has since expanded to other American cities and has undertaken excavation of landfill sites. Among many of the important results of Rathje, were his conclusion on landfill degradation and consumer waste patterns. For example, an intuitive idea that existed before Rathje's work is that people will waste less expensive food in times of economic recession. Rathje's landfill project proved this idea to be incorrect: when resources are scarce, people tend to buy larger quantities of -for example- beef-meat, when they are on sale, only to end up throwing it out again as they have bought too much to consume before the expiration dates. Rathje's data shows that waste beef is far more common during an economic recession. Another idea Rathje shattered is that of paper degradation in landfills. For a long time, it was believed that paper is a relatively safe and environmentally friendly waste product, degrading quickly in landfills. Rathje showed, however, that paper is typically a bad degrader: newspapers dumped in landfills as much as over half a century ago, turn up again as fresh and as readable as the day they were issued.
