= Arts and Humanities Focus Program =

Coordinates: 40.80690°N 96.68524°W

Arts and Humanities

Location
- 643 S. 25 Street; Lincoln, Nebraska; United States

Information
- Type: Public magnet high school
- Established: 1999
- School board: Lincoln Public Schools
- Principal: James Blake
- Faculty: 4
- Grades: 9-12
- Nickname: Arts
- Website: arts.lps.org

Arts and Humanities Focus Program, commonly referred to as Arts, is a focus program that specializes in art and the humanities. The school opened in 1999, and is housed in a historic bottling plant along the banks of Antelope Creek in Lincoln, Nebraska, United States.

== Academics ==
The program's current regular activities include:

- An entry in Lincoln's First Friday art gallery exhibitions on the first Friday of every month, where the students show off their newest work.
- Several visits to the Sheldon Memorial Art Gallery
- Occasional visits to an academic lecture forum or welcoming of a guest lecturer to the program
- A partnership with the Arts are Basic Aesthetic Education program

The Arts and Humanities Focus program has welcomed several speakers over the past six semesters, including actor and director Peter Riegert, New York mime Bill Bowers, DC Comics and Marvel Comics cartoonist Bob Hall, and director Rodney Evans.

Past speakers who have visited include author Daniel Quinn, author and activist Howard Zinn, and President of the ACLU Nadine Strossen.
