= Contemporary archaeology =

Archaeological sub-discipline

Contemporary archaeology is a field of archaeological research that focuses on the most recent (20th and 21st century) past, and also increasingly explores the application of archaeological thinking to the contemporary world. It has also been referred to as the archaeology of the 'contemporary past'. The use of this term in the United Kingdom is particularly associated with the Contemporary and Historical Archaeology in Theory (CHAT) conference group. The field forms part of historical archaeology, or the archaeology of the modern period. Unlike ethnoarchaeology, contemporary archaeology studies the recent and contemporary past in its own right, rather than to develop models that can inform the study of the more distant past.

== Scope ==
Often informed by anthropological material culture studies, but characterised by putting traditional archaeological methods and practices to new uses, research in this field generally aims to make an archaeological contribution to broader social scientific studies of the contemporary world, focusing especially upon contributing methods of studying material things (objects, landscapes, buildings, material heritage, etc.) to sociological, geographical and political studies of the modern world. The field has developed especially in heritage management, for example through English Heritage's "Change and Creation" programme on the landscapes of the later 20th century. As such, contemporary archaeology aims to explore the characteristics of diverse and rapid change across micro and macro scales by using a range of conventional and experimental archaeology investigative techniques. Like all archaeological scholarship and practice, contemporary archaeology uses both inductive reasoning and deductive reasoning approaches, which can include archaeological modelling.

Quentin Lewis recognized, contemporary archaeology has a firmer footing in the UK and Europe than it does in North America, or at least it is not an especially recognizable scholarly niche quite yet in the US. The work of scholars in the UK and Europe has turned to some materiality that is admittedly distinctive if not unique, such as the extensive scholarship of the landscapes of 20th century warfare (for instance, English Heritage’s ambitious Cold War Monuments project, Gabriel Moshenska’s work on British air raid shelters and children’s homefront experiences of World War II, Heinrich Natho’s study of Norwegian World War II coastal defenses, and Alfredo Gonzalez-Ruibal’s analysis of Spanish Civil War Monuments); Laura McAtackney’s work on “peace walls” in northern Ireland; Anna Badcock and Robert Johnston's study of protest camp sites in Derbyshire; and contemporary graffiti (Paul Graves-Brown and John Schofield have cleverly captivated many journalists and questioned what archaeologists value with their assessment of Sex Pistols graffiti). Yet for all these distinctive dimensions of British and European heritage we could certainly point to just as many equally interesting material experiences in every corner of North America. Some of the visibility of contemporary archaeology is inevitably linked to a British and European willingness to conduct material analysis that does not require excavation. Outside North America a vast number of scholars call themselves archaeologists while studying space, the built environment, and a broad range of material things without necessarily wielding a trowel. In the US historical archaeology has fashioned a particularly productive niche by focusing on field excavation and everyday materiality, and much of our training is devoted to field methods and analysis of a distinctive range of commodities like ceramics, glass, and faunal remains that are routinely recovered from excavation contexts on nearly any historic period site.

Despite a history reaching back as far, at least, as William Rathje's "garbology" project, contemporary archaeology remains a new sub-discipline within the university. In remaining focused on archaeology's ability to tell stories that reach beyond official or formal discourse, contemporary archaeology has the potential to offer significant political critique.

== Bibliography ==
- Bradley, A., V. Buchli, G. Fairclough, D. Hicks, J. Miller and J. Schofield 2004. Change and Creation: Historic Landscape Character 1950-2000. London: English Heritage.
- Buchli, V. 1999. An Archaeology of Socialism. Oxford: Berg.
- Buchli, V. and G. Lucas (eds.) 2001. Archaeologies of the Contemporary Past. London: Routledge
- González-Ruibal, A. 2020. An Archaeology of the Contemporary Era. London: Routledge.
- Graves-Brown, P. M. (ed) 2000. Matter, Materiality and Modern Culture. London: Routledge.
- Graves-Brown, P., R. Harrison and A. Piccini (eds.). 2013. The Oxford Handbook of the Archaeology of the Contemporary World. Oxford: Oxford University Press.
- Harrison, R. and J. Schofield (eds.), 2010. After Modernity: Archaeological Approaches to the Contemporary Past. Oxford: Oxford University Press.
- Holtorf, C and Piccini, A. (eds) 2011. Contemporary Archaeologies: Excavating Now. 2nd edition. Peter Lang GmbH
- McAtackney, L. and S. Penrose. 2016. "The contemporary in post-medieval archaeology". Post-medieval Archaeology (50)
- Rathje, W. L. and C. Murphy 2001. Rubbish! The Archaeology of Garbage. Tucson: The University of Arizona Press.
- Theune, Cl. 2018. A Shadow of War: Archaeological approaches to uncovering the darker sides fo conflict from the 20th century. Leiden: Sidestone Press.
