= Thrashing =

The term thrashing may refer to:

- Thrashing (computer science), an effect of computer memory contention
- A severe corporal punishment
- A clear victory
- The dance style moshing
- Threshing, a process in agriculture
- Skateboard thrashing
- Vandalism
