= William Rathje =

American archaeologist (1945–2012)

William L. Rathje
- Born: July 1, 1945; United States
- Died: May 24, 2012 (aged 66); Tucson, Arizona, U.S.
- Education: Harvard University (PhD)
- Known for: Tucson Garbage Project - Founding the field of garbology
- Notable work: Rubbish! The Archaeology of Garbage (1992)
- Title: Professor Emeritus, University of Arizona - Consulting Professor, Stanford University
- Awards: AAAS Award for Public Understanding of Science and Technology (1990)
- Scientific career
- Fields: Archaeology, Anthropology, Garbology
- Workplaces: University of Arizona, Stanford University

William Laurens Rathje (July 1, 1945 – May 24, 2012) was an American archaeologist. He was professor emeritus of anthropology at the University of Arizona, with a joint appointment with the Bureau of Applied Research in Anthropology, and was consulting professor of anthropological sciences at Stanford University. He was the longtime director of the Tucson Garbage Project, which studied trends in discards by field research in Tucson, Arizona, and in landfills elsewhere, pioneering the field now known as garbology. His work included behavioural archaeology.

== Career ==
Rathje received his PhD in anthropology from Harvard University in 1971. His academic interests were archaeology, early civilizations, modern material culture studies, and Mesoamerica. He first became known as director of the National Geographic-sponsored Cozumel Archaeological Project (Harvard/U of Arizona: Feb–June 1973), which established Cozumel's significance as an Olmec and Mayan port of trade.

With his students at the University of Arizona, Rathje began Le Projet du Garbàge in 1973, sorting waste at Tucson's landfill. Early results showed that Tucson residents discarded 10 per cent of the food they purchased and that middle-income households wasted more food than the poor or wealthy.

He received the 1990 Award for Public Understanding of Science and Technology from the American Association for the Advancement of Science for "his innovative contributions to public understanding of science and its societal impacts by demonstrating with his creative 'Garbage Project' how the scientific method can document problems and identify solutions."

Except for several years in the early 2000s, during his tenure at Stanford, Rathje lived in Tucson, Arizona.

== Works ==
- A Study of Changing Pre-Columbian Commercial Systems, with Jeremy A Sabloff and Judith G Connor, Cambridge, Mass.: Peabody Museum of Archaeology and Ethnology, Harvard University, 1975. ISBN 0-87365-902-3
- Rathje, William Rubbish!, The Atlantic Monthly, December 1989
- Rathje, William & Cullen Murphy (1992). Rubbish! The archaeology of garbage. New York: HarperCollins.
- Use Less Stuff: Environmentalism for Who We Really Are, with Robert M Lilienfeld, New York: Ballantine Pub. Group, 1998. ISBN 0-449-00168-7
