= Science Focus Program =

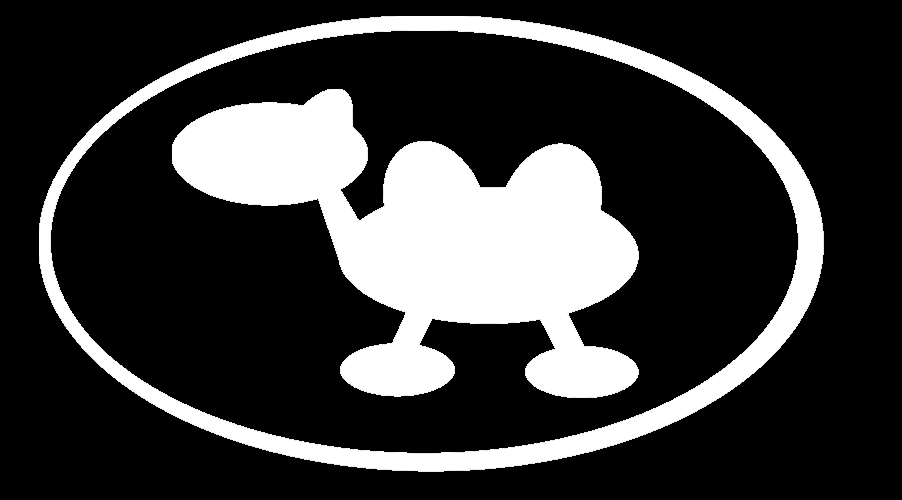

Location
- 1222 S. 27th Street; Lincoln, Nebraska; United States

Information
- Type: Public magnet high school
- Established: 1997
- School board: Lincoln Public Schools
- Faculty: 9
- Grades: 9-12
- Color
- Mascot: Camel
- Nickname: Zoo School
- Website: zoo.lps.org

The Science Focus Program (SFP) or Zoo School, or simply Zoo, is a part of Lincoln Public Schools and is one of the district's three focus programs, along with the Arts and Humanities Focus Program and the Career Academy. It is located at the Lincoln Children's Zoo in Lincoln, Nebraska, United States, and is described as "a small community of mature learners participating both in a traditional and non-traditional style of learning. A place where students play an active role in defining their learning environment and education."

== Staff ==
The Science Focus Program has five teachers:

- Pete White: History and Social Studies
- Sally Hunt: English and Communication
- Emily Rose-Seifferlein: Physical and Earth Sciences
- Mitch Bern: Biological Sciences
- Matt Johnson: Mathematics

Amy Proffitt serves as secretary, Amy Pickerill as special education coordinator, Jamie Cardwell-Gemmell as campus supervisor, Melissa Sellon as Counselor, Erin Owens as Social Worker, and Michelle Leidholt as site coordinator .

== Academic form ==
The Science Focus Program runs on an A-day/B-day block schedule, with the days alternating throughout the week. Formerly on Wednesdays, but currently on Fridays, "Community/Focus Days", are commonly run on an alternative schedule, reserved for additional class times for core classes and applied arts.

Instead of having a finals week, Science Focus Program has a portfolio week. Portfolios are projects that are specific to each class that are used in place of finals. Each class has its own portfolio. Portfolios are handed out during each semester and students are expected to complete and present them at the end of the semester.

== Campus ==
The Science Focus Program's campus is located in the southeast corner of the Lincoln Children's Zoo. The two portable buildings house the computer lab, a science room and laboratory, and the English classroom. The Camelot Commons, a larger, 2-story structure at the edge of the Science Focus Program campus, houses the social science, mathematics, and natural science classrooms.

== History ==
The idea for the Science Focus Program originated in 1995. Teachers met and worked part-time planning for the program, and part-time teaching at their high schools.

The main idea for the focus program was to give students an alternative to regular high school. The teachers' vision consisted of a place where students could come and feel welcome and comfortable enough to express their individual talents and ideas.

The school opened for the 1997–1998 school year, accepting juniors and seniors. Since then, changes have been made, allowing the Science Focus Program to accept sophomores and freshmen.

On September 14, 2017, the Science Focus Program was visited by President Donald Trump's education secretary, Betsy DeVos. Her appearance was met with student protesters on the inside and public protesters outside, though the school day was urged to proceed as normal and no serious incidents occurred. The school's small class size was praised by DeVos.

For many years, the Lincoln Children's Zoo hosted a "Science Day" in which the public, along with elementary schools, walk around the zoo as Science Focus Program students enrich their knowledge with fun scientific activities. All students worked stations and participated.

The Science Focus Program moved into a new, single building (differing from the former 3 building setup) on the outskirts of the Lincoln Children's Zoo, correlating with the Lincoln Children's Zoo expansion plan. The building was finished in July 2019 and the first class moved in during the Fall of 2019

== Student life ==
The Science Focus Program enrolls new students every year. Current clubs as of the 2024-25 school year include Student Council, Science Olympiad, and SFP Legacy Club: Archives and Alumni Outreach. Former clubs include the Key Club, Women in STEM Club, Dungeons & Dragons Club, and Yearbook Club, Minecraft Club, Biking Club, G&S Enterprises, Poker Club, Roots & Shoots, Gardening Club, Coloring Club, and Magic: The Gathering Club.

== See also ==
- PAST Foundation
- Arts and Humanities Focus Program
