= Lincoln Public Schools =

School district in Nebraska, USA

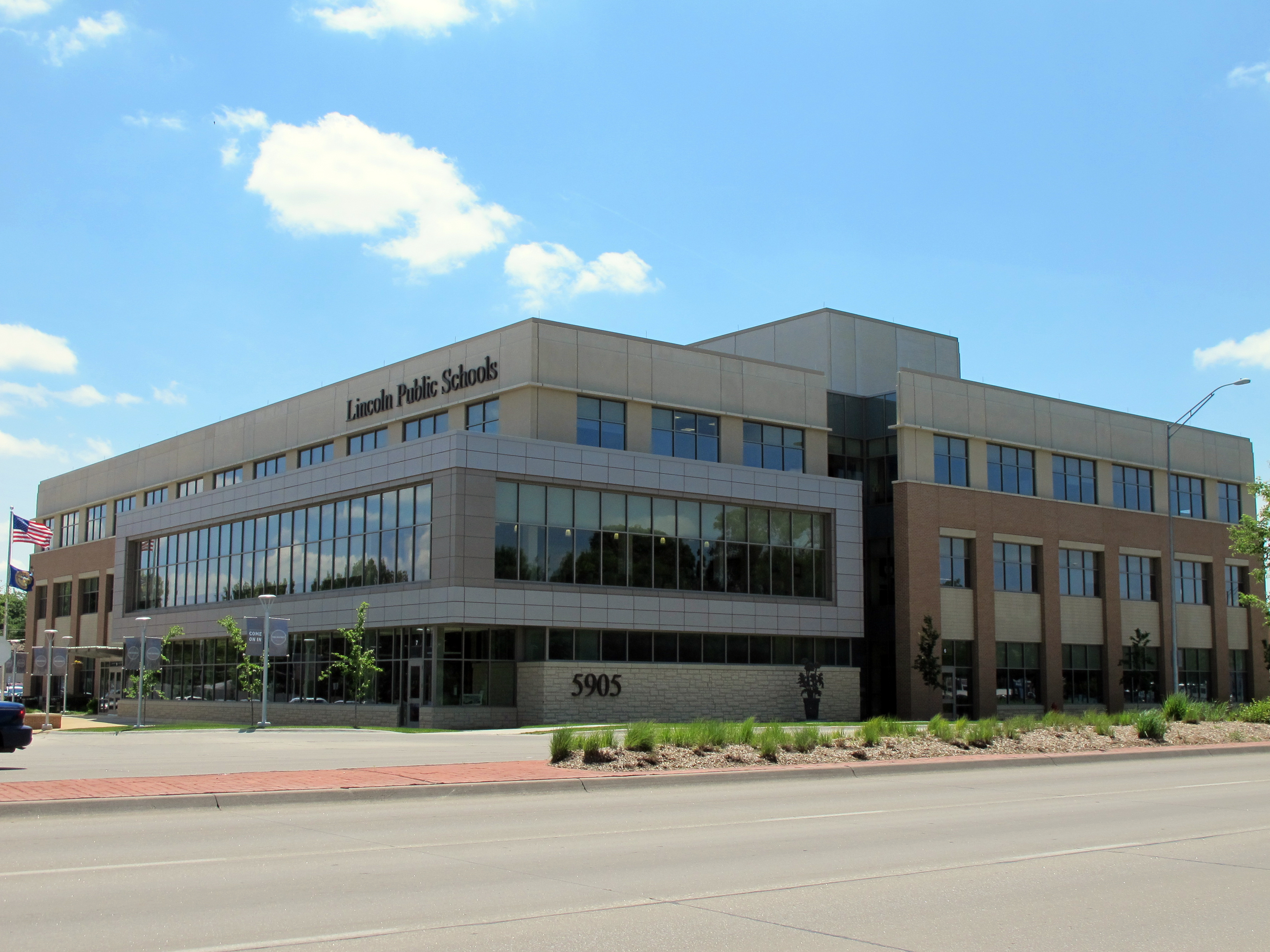
Lincoln Public Schools district office

Lincoln Public Schools is the second largest public school district in the U.S. state of Nebraska, located in the heart of the Great Plains. The school district of over 42,000 students is home to more than 70 schools and programs.

The current superintendent is Dr. John Skretta, who was appointed as permanent superintendent in September 2025 after serving in an interim capacity since January 2025.

As of 2026, students of Lincoln Public Schools speak over 100 languages; largely due to Lincoln being a destination of many refugees, who have settled there since the U.S. Government declared Lincoln a refugee-friendly city in the 1970s.

The district includes almost all of the Lincoln city limits, all of Yankee Hill, and portions of Cheney and Emerald.

== History ==
The first public school district was organized in the city in 1864 by early pioneers John Young, John Cadman, and Milton Langdon. A stone seminary built on 9th and P Streets by John Young served as a schoolhouse in 1866, with classes taught by Mr. and Mrs. H.W. Merrill. After a fire gutted this building, a new stone schoolhouse was constructed at 11th and Q Streets. The first Lincoln High School was built on 15th and M Streets in 1871. A three-story structure, this building included classrooms for 1st through 12th grades.

As the town's population grew, additional brick school buildings were constructed around town including Bancroft School at 9th and T Streets (1881), Park School at 8th and F Streets (1882), Capital School at 15th and G Streets (1886), Bryant School at 18th and Q Streets (1887), the original Elliott School at 26th and Vine Streets (1888), the original Belmont School at 14th and Belmont (1889), Cherry Street School at 20th and Cherry Streets (1890), Clinton School at 29th and Clinton Streets (1891), Willard School on West A Street (1895), the original Randolph School at 27th and Randolph (1899), Hayward School at 9th and Z (1902), and two additional buildings on the Lincoln High School campus, including the Administration Building (1897) and McKinley School (1902).

In the 1890s, Lincoln began offering Kindergarten and adult night classes at several locations. A larger Lincoln High School opened in 1915 at 22nd and J Streets. In 1919, Lincoln Public Schools adopted a new 6-3-3 model for grade organization with the junior high school system. New junior high schools included 7th through 9th grades and offered prevocational classes in addition to academic studies. These buildings included Whittier Junior High School at 22nd and Vine Streets (1923), Bancroft Prevocational School at 14th and U Streets (1915), Irving Junior High School at 22nd and Van Dorn Streets (1927), and Everett Junior High School at 11th and C Streets (1928). In addition, the original Elliott Elementary building was repurposed as the 26th & O Junior High School in 1922.

Lincoln Northeast High School opened in 1941, serving the annexed communities of Havelock, University Place, and Bethany. The next period of large-scale building coincided with the post-war baby boom. 18 new schools were constructed between 1953 and 1965, including Beattie Elementary, Southeast High School, Lefler Junior High School, Dawes Elementary School, Pershing Elementary School, Bryan Elementary School, Meadow Lane Elementary School, Brownell Elementary School, Culler Junior High School, Arnold Elementary School, Mickle Junior High School, Morley Elementary School, Pound Junior High School, O'Connor Elementary School, McPhee Elementary School, Pyrtle Elementary School, Riley Elementary School, and Rousseau Elementary School.

Throughout its history, Lincoln Public Schools has used four administration buildings. The first Administration Building at 15th and M was used from 1897 to 1941. The Public School Administration Building was housed in the defunct Bonacum Catholic High School building at 22nd and Randolph Streets from 1941 to 1990. Lincoln Public Schools District Office was housed in a building at 5901 O Street purchased from State Farm Insurance Company from 1990 until its destruction by arson in 2011. Finally, the Steve Joel District Leadership Center at 5905 O Street has functioned as administrative offices since 2013.

In the late 1990s, Lincoln Public Schools began transitioning to a 6-3-4 grade system with the adoption of the middle school system. 9th grade students were moved into high schools, and middle schools included 6th through 8th grades. The first junior high schools to convert to middle schools included Mickle Middle School and Culler Middle School in 1993, with Lincoln Northeast High School becoming the first high school in Lincoln in the modern era to include 9th grade. In the 1990s and 2000s, Lincoln Public Schools expanded high school offerings to include focus programs, including the Science Focus Program, Arts and Humanities Focus Program, the Career Academy, and others.

In 2011, the Lincoln Public Schools District Office was destroyed by arson. In 2013, a new district office building opened at 5905 O Street. In 2022, this building was renamed the Steve Joel District Leadership Center in honor of superintendent Steve Joel who served from 2010 to 2022.

== English Language Learners ==
At Lincoln Public Schools, during the 2018–19 school year, the English Language Learners (ELL) program had 2,962 students from approximately 150 countries, who spoke approximately 125 different languages. Some of the most common first-languages spoken within the program are Arabic, Chinese, French, Karen, Kurdish, Nuer, Russian, Spanish, Ukrainian and Vietnamese. The top two first-language groups, as of 2018–19 school year, are Arabic and Kurdish speakers (38.4%), and Spanish speakers (25.2%). From the 2010–11 to the 2018–19 school years, LPS saw Arabic and Kurdish ELL students increase by over 196%, from 321 Arabic and 63 Kurdish speaking students to 605 Arabic and 532 Kurdish speaking students. The continually increasing influx of refugees and immigrants to Lincoln over recent years, which has included refugees/immigrants from Iraq, Mexico, Burma and refugee camps in Thailand, has caused LPS to hire additional ELL teachers at an increasingly rapid pace. However, due to recent immigration restrictions on the national level, ELL numbers have been declining somewhat since 2018.

== Music literacy ==
Music literacy in Lincoln begins early with Lincoln Public School music programs that provide children with the opportunity to begin strings in 4th grade and band in the 5th grade. Collaboration between the University of Nebraska at Lincoln and LPS provides children in the 3rd grade with weekly instruction in classical strings. These programs and others are supported by music retail stores within the city.

== Schools ==
=== Elementary schools ===
- Adams Elementary School
- Arnold Elementary School
- Beattie Elementary School
- Belmont Elementary School
- Brownell Elementary School
- Calvert Elementary School
- Campbell Elementary School
- Cavett Elementary School
- Clinton Elementary School
- Eastridge Elementary School
- Elliott Elementary School
- Everett Elementary School
- Fredstrom Elementary School
- Hartley Elementary School
- Hill Elementary School
- Holmes Elementary School
- Humann Elementary School
- Huntington Elementary School
- Kahoa Elementary School
- Kloefkorn Elementary School
- Kooser Elementary School
- Lakeview Elementary School
- Maxey Elementary School
- McPhee Elementary School
- Meadow Lane Elementary School
- Morley Elementary School
- Norwood Park Elementary School
- Pershing Elementary School
- Prescott Elementary School
- Pyrtle Elementary School
- Randolph Elementary School
- Riley Elementary School
- Robinson Elementary School
- Roper Elementary School
- Rousseau Elementary School
- Saratoga Elementary School
- Sheridan Elementary School
- West Lincoln Elementary School
- Wysong Elementary School
- Zeman Elementary School

=== Middle schools ===
- Culler Middle School
- Dawes Middle School
- Goodrich Middle School
- Irving Middle School
- Lefler Middle School
- Lux Middle School
- Mickle Middle School
- Moore Middle School
- Park Middle School
- Pound Middle School
- Schoo Middle School
- Scott Middle School

=== High schools ===
- Lincoln East High School
- Lincoln High School
- Lincoln North Star High School
- Lincoln Northeast High School
- Lincoln Northwest High School
- Lincoln Southeast High School
- Lincoln Southwest High School
- Lincoln Standing Bear High School
