= Operation Tamarisk =

Cold War espionage operation

Operation Tamarisk was a Cold War-era operation run by the military intelligence services of the U.S., U.K., and France through their military liaison missions in East Germany, that gathered discarded paper, letters, and garbage from Soviet trash bins and military maneuvers, including used toilet paper.

== History ==
As described in The Hidden Hand by Richard Aldrich, Soviet troops were not issued toilet paper in the field. This led them to use official documents as toilet paper, but as the paper was not soluble it was put into bins. The US, UK and France then used their spies to retrieve the soiled documents from the bins. The spies complained to their handlers that they had to go through the bins that contained fecal matter and even amputated limbs, in the case of hospital rubbish bins. When told this, the handlers asked them to bring back the limbs as well, so they could study what type of shrapnel the Soviets were using.

According to Tony Geraghty, tamarisk was BRIXMIS jargon for "sifting through the detritus of military exercises." This included extracting shrapnel from tissue disposal sites at hospitals and salvaging documents used as toilet paper where no actual toilet paper had been issued, but also less disgusting finds such as a discarded personal notebook containing technical drawings.

Steve Gibson describes Operation Tamarisk as "not a tri-mission task and results were not always disseminated to them. Operation Tomahawk was an exceptionally successful and closely guarded secret and yet it was a stunningly obvious undertaking." He suggests that the name was changed from TAMARISK to TOMAHAWK "at the whim of Spandau [HQ], usually because someone outside the 'need-to-know' circle was brief about it and we didn't trust them to keep their mouth shut" and the slang changed to calling it a "Tommy". Gibson describes it more generally as searching dumps because "In large towns and cities the disposal of rubbish was crudely organised …. The Soviets were no exception to this carefree disposal of waste, quite often simply dumping their rubbish outside the back door of their barracks." Thus Gibson's claim is that this was a wider operation, not simply about a shortage of toilet paper, although he does note that troops on exercise often used military paperwork as toilet paper and this was recovered.

On the topic of limbs, Gibson writes that in 1981 "the [Brixmis] Mission had learnt that Soviet soldiers with chemical warfare injuries among other horrific wounds from the war in Afghanistan were being evacuated back to East Germany for treatment. Brixmis was tasked to recover evidence for further medical examination. It was presumed that they were being recovered to the DDR in order to receive the best possible treatment the Warsaw Pact could offer …. There followed some of the most harrowing work ever undertaken by the Mission." This suggests a more specific reason why limbs were recovered.

Gibson also notes that so much of what was in the dumps was never recovered, as the volume of material was too great and the opportunities too few, which had the effect that it was unlikely anything could have been planted for them to find. The intelligence thus gathered was regarded as less contaminated (in an intelligence sense, even if physically soiled) than other sources.

Leslie Woodhead was said that it was one of the most successful espionage operations in the entire Cold War.
