= Fountain Springs =

Fountain Springs may refer to:

- Fountain Springs, California, a settlement established in Tulare County
- Fountain Springs, Pennsylvania, a census-designated place in Schuylkill County
- Fountain Springs Park, a wilderness park in Delaware County, Iowa

== See also ==
- Fountain Spring, West Virginia, an unincorporated community located in Wood County
