= 1894 Rock Island railroad wreck =

Railway incident in Nebraska, United States

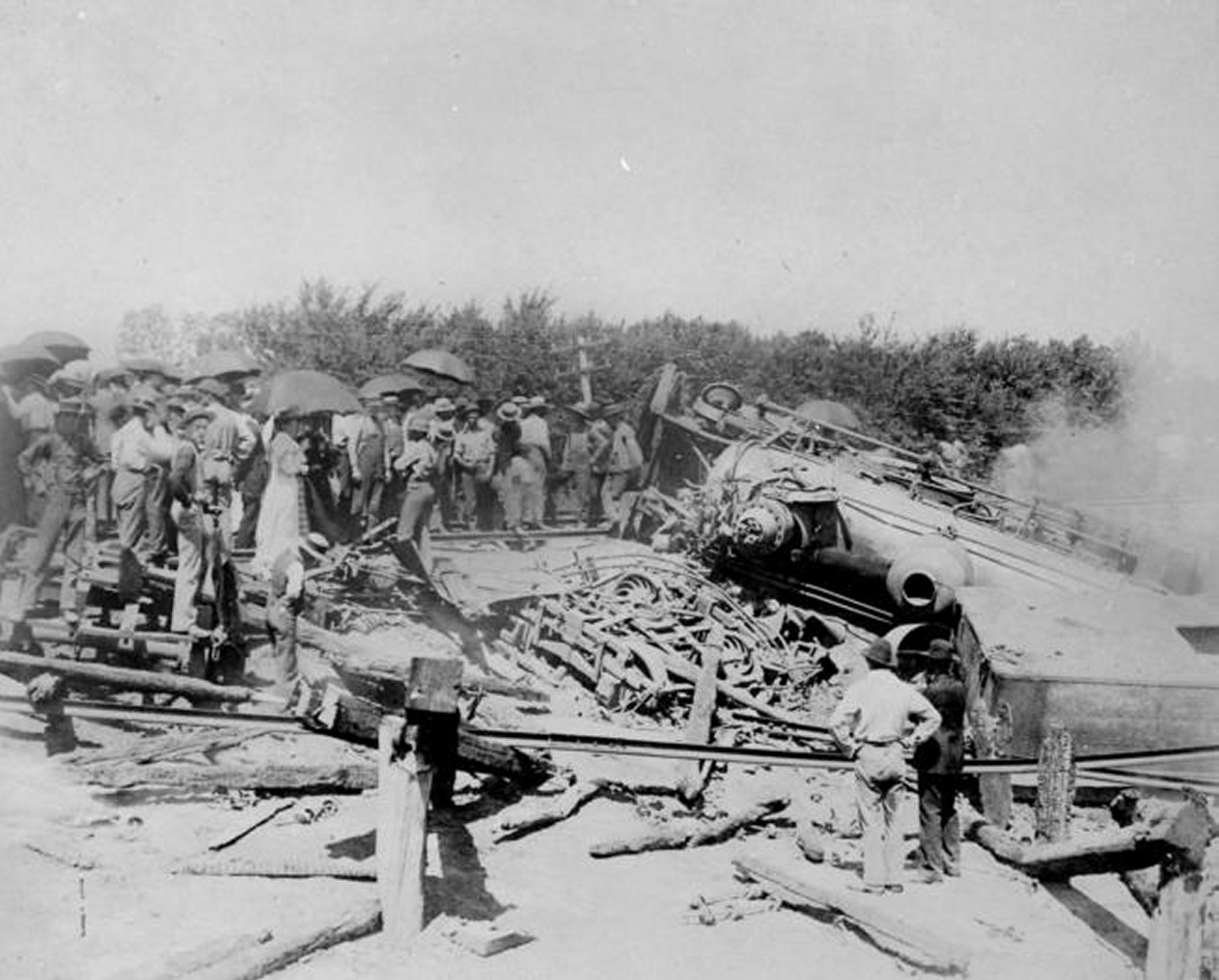
- Aftermath of the wreck

Details
- Date: August 9, 1894; 131 years ago 21:20
- Location: Wilderness Park, Lincoln, Nebraska
- Coordinates: 40°44′38″N 96°42′45″W
- Country: United States
- Line: Chicago, Rock Island and Pacific Railroad
- Cause: Sabotage

Statistics
- Deaths: 11

The 1894 Rock Island railroad wreck occurred when a locomotive pulling two passenger cars was derailed on August 9, 1894, in Lincoln, Nebraska, killing eleven people. There were signs that a 400-foot trestle had been purposely damaged, and it was ruled as sabotage. A local man was jailed for second degree murder, though his guilt remains in doubt. It was one of the worst cases of mass murder in the state of Nebraska.

== Crash ==
At 7:30PM on August 9, 1894, Locomotive 213 departed the station in Fairbury, Nebraska, with two passenger cars, due to reach Lincoln, Nebraska two hours later. At approximately 9:20PM, minutes away from its destination, the train reached a 400-foot-long trestle which was located southwest of town and carried trains forty feet above the waters of Salt Creek. (Today this trestle passes above the Jamaica North Trail at Wilderness Park.) The rails began to spread apart as the engine crossed the trestle and, as the passenger cars began to cross, the weight became too much for the structure, and the entire train crashed into the creek below. Upon impact, the engine burst, spilling hot coals on both the train and the wooden trestle, and soon flames covered both.

According to a newspaper article at the time:

It was an awful sight. The flames mounted high in the heavens coloring the entire southern sky a brilliant carmine while the moonbeams fell upon the glowing mass below from which mortal shrieks of agony and pain were heard to issue.

Three men escaped the wreckage quickly. Colonel C.J. Bills organized an effort to rescue other passengers with the help of Jay McDowell and crewman Harry Foote. The three determined that the passengers in the first car and engine were beyond help and focused on the rear car, from which they rescued fifteen passengers. As Bills and McDowell ran to find help, Foote twice climbed onto the wreckage to pull out two fellow crewmen, despite having suffered a broken leg himself.

The first building Bills and McDowell could see was the State Penitentiary, two miles away, from which they called the fire and police departments and the railroad. A train reached the scene around 40 minutes after the incident and carried the survivors to Lincoln. Due to the equipment available at the time and the conditions and location of the wreck, no fire wagons could reach the site. It was reported that "The only thing to do was just let the whole pile burn."

Of the thirty-three passengers aboard when leaving Fairbury, eleven were killed in the crash.

== Investigation ==
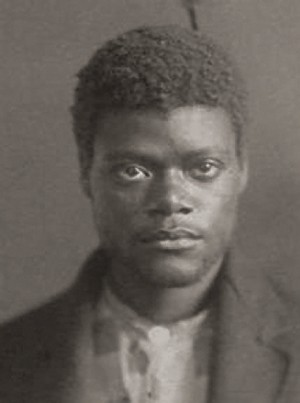
George Washington Davis

Survivors of the crash began to tell police that, following the crash, they had seen an unknown man holding a lantern near the trestle. This, along with evidence found at the scene, suggested that the crash was not an accident but an act of sabotage.

Police found that spikes had been pulled from the trestle, wrench marks were found on the rail, and gouges in the railroad ties showed that a crowbar had been used to pry them apart. In the grass by the trestle, a 40-pound crowbar was found. Within two days, police arrested George Washington Davis, an African-American man. Survivors claimed Davis had been the man with the lantern they had seen at the wreck.

When police questioned Davis as to why he was at the scene of the wreck, he said that he had run four miles from a "colored club" in Lincoln to witness the wreck. However, Davis's description of the crash does not align with the timeline he presented. Most notably, when questioned about the sound of the crash, Davis claimed that it was "not too bad until the engine blew up." As the engine exploded immediately on impact, Davis's claim to have heard the train before its engine exploded does not fit the official account of the crash.

Other members of the growing African-American community in Lincoln attested to his innocence. This was a period of African Americans leaving the South for better jobs in growing industrial cities.

The police had almost no evidence to suggest that Davis was the perpetrator, Davis never admitted guilt, and investigators could not offer any explanation of motive for his supposed crime. Davis was tried twice for the sabotage. During the first trial, first degree murder could not be proven, and the jury could not reach a verdict. During the second trial, the jury was informed by the judge that should prosecutors fail to prove Davis' guilt of first degree murder, the jury could convict the defendant of second degree murder. In 1895, Davis was convicted of second degree murder and sentenced to life in prison. Ten years later, Governor John Mickey paroled Davis, citing a lack of evidence or motive, and "grave doubts" as to Davis' involvement in the case.

To date, the sabotage is one of the largest instances of mass murder in the state of Nebraska. The 1958 killing spree by Charles Starkweather resulted in eleven deaths, and the Westroads Mall shooting of 2007, which resulted in nine deaths, are other examples of mass murders by individuals. It is also the largest officially unsolved crime in Lincoln history.

== Legacy ==
Joel Williamsen, a local author, happened upon the story of the crash while researching for his historical fiction novel Barrelhouse Boys. Williamsen was inspired by the actions of Harry Foote, and wanted to commemorate his bravery.

Williamsen donated $1,200 and worked with the Nebraska State Historical Society and Lincoln Parks and Recreation to cast and install a historical marker at the site of the wreck in 2010, on the 116th anniversary of the event. The marker includes an 800-word summary of the crash and is found along the Jamaica North trail in Wilderness Park, at the site of the crash.

== Image gallery ==
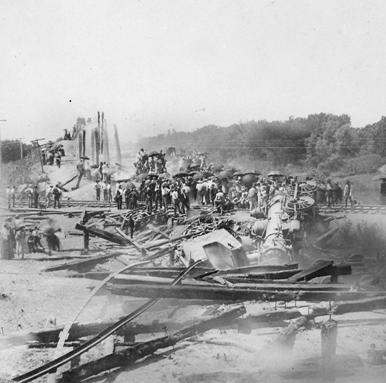
Another view of the aftermath.

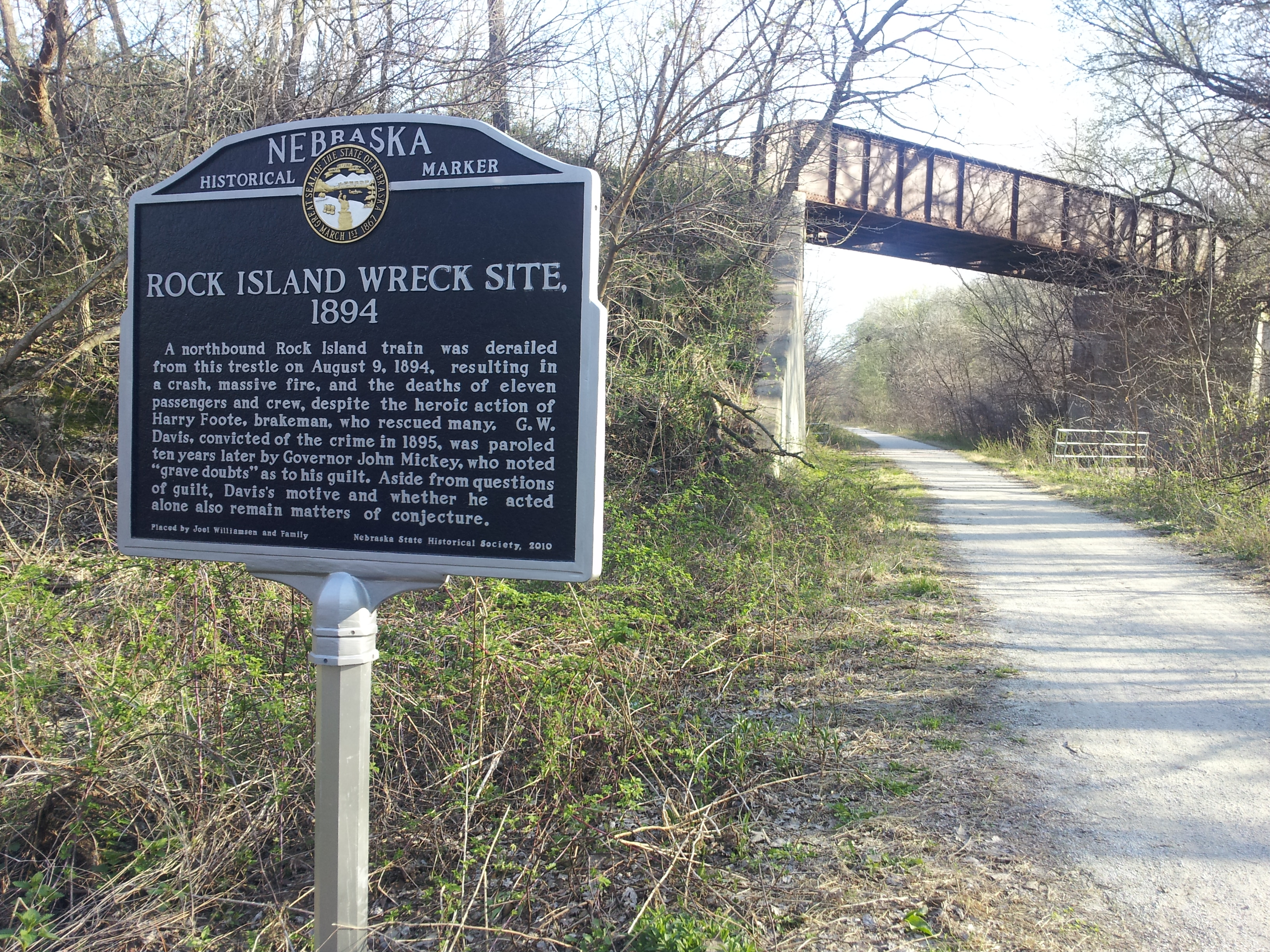
The marker and trestle at the site of the crash.

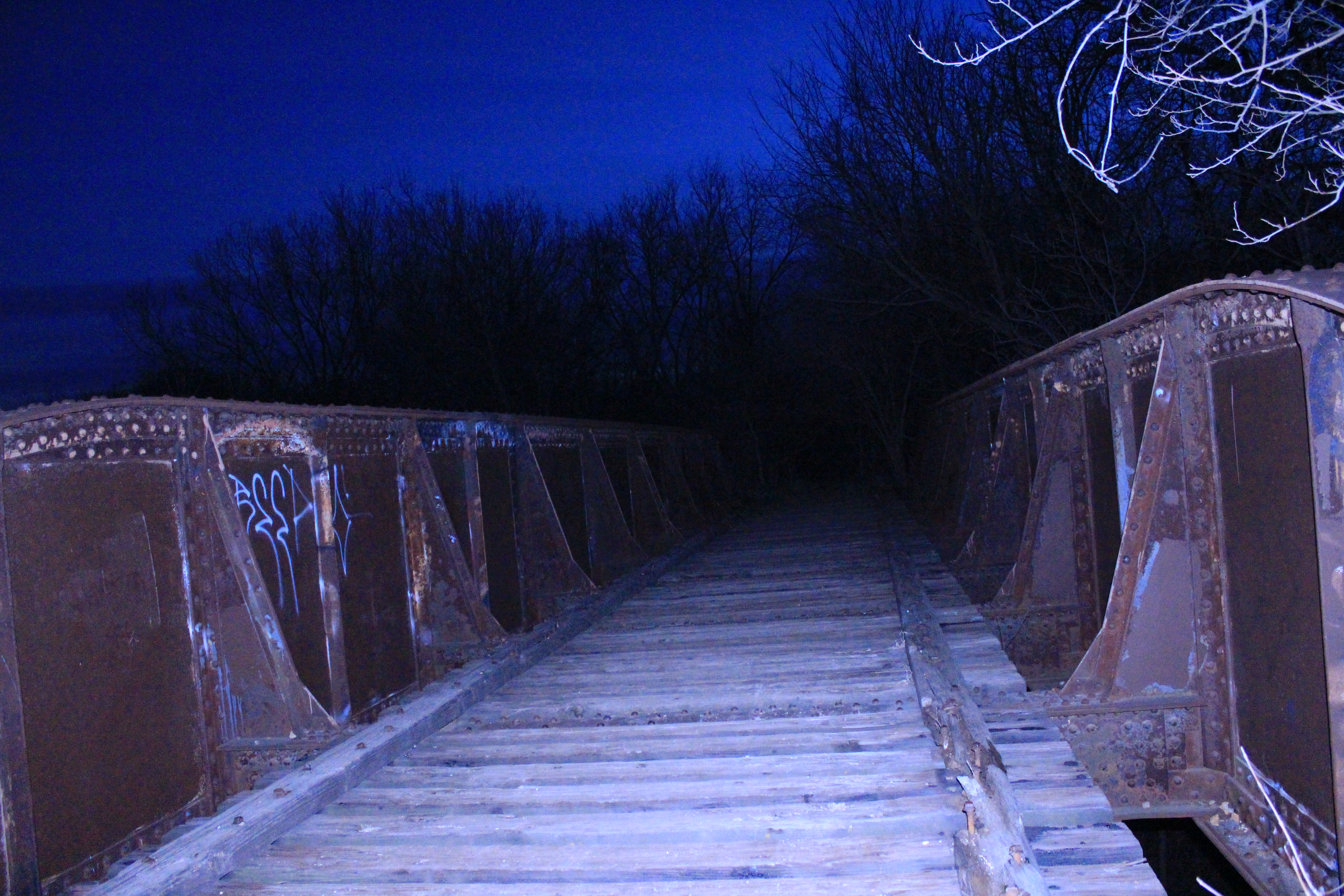
Close-up view of the trestle, facing west.

== See also ==
- List of rail accidents (1880–1899)
- List of unsolved deaths
- Wilderness Park
- History of Lincoln, Nebraska
