= List of parks in Lincoln, Nebraska =

The following is a table of parks in Lincoln, Nebraska. All of the properties listed are maintained by Lincoln Parks & Recreation.

Parks in Lincoln, Nebraska
District	Park Name	Park Type	Size (acres)	Location
NE	34th & Baldwin Avenue	Mini	0.2	N. 34th Street & Baldwin Avenue
NE	45th & Gladstone Playground	Mini	0.2	N. 45th Street & Gladstone
NE	48th & Adams Park	Pocket	0.23	N. 48th & Adams Streets
NE	Antelope Park Triangle	Regional	16.14	27th & Capitol Pkwy - A Street
NE	Arbor Lake	Conservancy	132.64	N. 27th Street & Arbor Road
NE	Ballard Park	Community	9.1	N. 66th Street & Kearney Ave.
NE	Bethany Park	Community	9.67	N. 65th & Vine Streets
NE	Boosalis Park	Conservancy	66.52	N. 44th Street & Fletcher Ave.
NE	Burns Park	Conservancy	14	N. 98th & Adams Streets
NE	Easterday Park	Neighborhood	5.26	6130 Adams Street
NE	ECCO Park	Pocket	1.22	N. 47th Street & Holdrege Ave.
NE	Fleming Fields Recreational Sports Park	Community	29	30th Street & Leighton Ave.
NE	Hamann Rose Garden	Garden/Plaza	0.8	S. 27th Street & Capitol Parkway
NE	Hartley Park	Mini	0.24	N. 31st & R Streets
NE	Havelock Park	Neighborhood	3.6	N. 64th Street & Ballard Ave.
NE	Herbert Park	Neighborhood	7.68	N. 81st Street & Trailridge Rd.
NE	Idylwild Park	Mini	0.4	Idylwild Drive & Apple Street
NE	Kahoa Park	Neighborhood	6.1	N. 78th Street & Leighton Ave.
NE	Kontras Park	Pocket	1.12	S. Cotner Blvd. & Aldrich Road
NE	Mahoney Park	Community	77	N. 70th Street & Fremont Ave.
NE	McAdams Park	Neighborhood	1.4	N. 44th & Y Streets
NE	Midtown Commons Park	Pocket	0.31	50th & N Streets
NE	Nevin Park	Mini	0.37	N. 32nd & Doane Streets
NE	Northern Lights Greenbelt	Conservancy	14.29	N. 83rd, Holdrege - Leighton
NE	Peter Pan Park	Community	11.13	N. 32nd & W Streets
NE	Piedmont Park	Neighborhood	9.25	S. 50th & C Streets
NE	Seacrest Park	Community	45.75	S. 70th & A Streets
NE	Stuhr Park	Neighborhood	2.23	S. 51st & M Streets
NE	Sunrise Park	Neighborhood	1.91	N. 73rd & Douglas Streets
NE	Taylor Park	Neighborhood	19.27	S. 63rd & Randolph Streets
NE	Touzalin Arboretum Islands	Boulevard	6.2	Adams - Havelock on Touzalin Blvd.
NE	Tyrrell Park	Neighborhood	12.51	N. 67th Street & Baldwin Ave.
NE	University Place Park	Community	22.1	N. 49th & Garland Streets
NE	UPCO Park	Neighborhood	6	N. 40th & Adams Streets
NE	Warner Wetlands	Conservancy	80	N. 98th Street & Highway 6
NE	Woods Park	Community	47.13	S. 33rd & J Streets
NW	10th & Charleston Park	Pocket	0.05	N. 10th & Charleston Streets
NW	3rd & A Overpass	Neighborhood	5.78	N. 3rd & A Streets
NW	Arnold Heights Park	Neighborhood	17.63	5325 W. Superior
NW	Ashley Heights Park	Neighborhood	2.1	NW 46th Street & W. Leighton Avenue
NW	Aster Mini Park	Mini	0.13	N. 8th & Aster Streets
NW	Bea Richmond Park	Pocket	0.1	N. 27th & Holdredge Streets
NW	Belmont Park	Neighborhood	14.12	N. 12th & Judson Streets
NW	Bowling Lake Park	Community	52	NW 48th & W. Cumming Streets
NW	Campbell Gardens	Garden/Plaza	0.03	N. 24th & L Streets
NW	Centennial Mall	Garden/Plaza	3.47	K - R on 15th Street
NW	Cooper Park	Neighborhood	11.52	S. 6th & D Streets
NW	Eagles View Park	Mini	0.3	NW 52nd Street & W. Knight Drive
NW	Goodhue Mall	Boulevard	0.8	A - H on S. 15th Street
NW	Government Square Park	Pocket	0.2	N. 10th & O Streets
NW	Hayward Park	Neighborhood	18.35	N. 9th Street & Military Ave.
NW	Hazel Abel Park	Garden/Plaza	0.5	S. 18th & E Streets
NW	Highlands Park	Neighborhood	10.86	W. Harvest Drive
NW	Highlands South Park	Conservancy	33	NW Fairway Drive to NW 1st Street
NW	Iron Horse Park	Mini	0.5	N. 7th & Q Streets
NW	Keech Park	Neighborhood	11.26	N. 14th & Superior Streets
NW	King Saline Wetland	Conservancy	60.6	SE of I-80 and 27th Street
NW	Lakeview Park	Neighborhood	2.59	NW 20th & W. Q Streets
NW	Lincoln Mall	Garden/Plaza	0.83	S. 10th - 14th on J Street
NW	Lintel Park	Neighborhood	2.1	N. 21st Street & Holdrege
NW	McWilliams Park	Pocket	0.5	N. 25th & T Streets
NW	Oak Lake Dog Run	Dog Run	20.32	N. 1st & Cornhusker Hwy
NW	Oak Lake Park	Community	186.39	Sun Valley Blvd. & Charleston Street
NW	Olympic Heights Park	Neighborhood	15.8	NW 52nd & W. Huntington
NW	Pentzer Park	Neighborhood	4.05	N. 27th & Potter Streets
NW	Roper (Max E.) Park	Community	144.3	N. 10th St. & Belmont - N. 3rd St. & Superior
NW	Schleich (Stephen C.) Park	Neighborhood	4	N. 34th Street & Ridge Park Rd.
NW	Schroeder/Willard Park	Neighborhood	2	W. Folsom Ave. & W. B Street
NW	Schwartzkopf Park	Mini	0.4	SW 1st & L Streets
NW	Seacrest Range	Conservancy	40.55	W. Folsom Ave. & W. E Street
NW	Shoemaker Marsh	Conservancy	160	1.3 miles north of N. 27th St. & Arbor Rd.
NW	Stonebridge Park	Mini	0.99	N. 18th St. & Redstone Rd.
NW	Sunken Gardens	Garden/Plaza	1.4	S. 26th & D Streets
NW	Trago Park	Neighborhood	8.05	N. 22nd & U Streets
NW	West Lincoln Park	Neighborhood	3.76	N. Main Street & W. Dawes Avenue
SE	27th & Old Cheney Rd.	Undeveloped	1.81	27th Street & Old Cheney Rd.
SE	40th & Highway 2 Park	Conservancy	19.58	S. 40th Street & Highway 2
SE	56th & London Road Park	Undeveloped	13.6	S. 56th Street & London Road
SE	American Legion Park	Neighborhood	1.1	S. 26th & Randolph Streets
SE	Antelope Park North	Regional	50.89	23rd & Capitol Pkwy - 27th & Capitol Pkwy
SE	Antelope Park South	Regional	25.9	A Street - 33rd & Sheridan Blvd.
SE	Bishop Heights Park	Neighborhood	7.02	S. 30th Street & Prescott Ave.
SE	Colonial Hills Park	Neighborhood	18.07	S. 64th Street & Bernese Blvd.
SE	Country View Park	Neighborhood	6	S. 56th Street & Union Drive
SE	Cripple Creek Park	Neighborhood	6.33	Brich Hollow & Beaver Creek Lanes
SE	Eden Park	Neighborhood	10.12	45th Street & Antelope Creek Rd.
SE	Edenton South Park	Neighborhood	4	Ashbrook Circle & Stevens Ridge Rd.
SE	Gapp Property	Conservancy	13.67	
SE	Hamann Meadows	Conservancy	8.34	S. 72nd St. & Pioneers Blvd.
SE	Henry Park	Neighborhood	7.01	S. 44th Street & Prescott Ave.
SE	Holmes Park	Regional	269.59	S. 70th Street & Normal Blvd.
SE	Jensen Park	Undeveloped	190.18	S. 84th Street & Yankee Hill Rd.
SE	Larson Park	Neighborhood	12.55	S. 54th Street & Woodland Ave.
SE	Mendoza Park	Neighborhood	0.3	Whitehall Land & Blackstone Rd.
SE	Neighbors Park	Neighborhood	4.3	S. 30th & D Streets
SE	Pansing Park	Neighborhood	9.3	S. 52nd & Van Dorn Streets
SE	Phares Park	Undeveloped	6.5	S. 84th Street & Glynoaks Dr.
SE	Pine Lake Park	Community	19.12	S. 60th Street & Pine Lake Rd.
SE	Pocras Park	Neighborhood	0.73	Bradfield Dr. & Sewell Street
SE	Porter (Clare) Park	Neighborhood	12	Brummond Dr. & Collister Road
SE	Rickman's Run	Dog Run	26	S. 70th Street & E of S. Holmes Park Road
SE	Roberts Park	Neighborhood	15.49	S. 56th & Sumner Streets
SE	Roose Park	Pocket	0.3	S. 52nd Street & Roose Ave.
SE	Sunburst Park	Mini	0.7	Sunburst Lane & Washington St.
SE	Tierra/Briarhurst Park	Community	123.3	S. 27th & Tierra - S. 37th & Carnelian
SE	Trendwood Park	Neighborhood	19.67	S. 77th & A Streets
SE	Veterans Memorial Garden	Garden/Plaza	2.5	Memorial & Veterans Drive; 3200 VM Drive
SE	Williamsburg Park	Neighborhood	10.56	S. 32nd & Raleigh Streets
SE	Witherbee Park	Pocket	0.6	S. 46th & O St.
SW	27th & South Park	Pocket	0.1	S. 27th & South Streets
SW	Bison Park	Undeveloped	55	Coddington Ave. & W. Van Dorn
SW	Breta Park	Boulevard	0.52	S. 19th & A Streets
SW	Coddington Park	Neighborhood	9.66	S. of A Street on Coddington Ave.
SW	Densmore Park	Community	61.54	6701 S. 14th Street
SW	Filbert Park	Neighborhood	4.66	School House Lane & Clearview Rd.
SW	Folsom Park	Undeveloped	5	
SW	Gerbig Parcel	Conservancy	17	1/3 Mile W. of S. 14th Street & Pine Lake Rd.
SW	Glebe Property	Conservancy	13	S. 2nd & South Streets
SW	Hollingsworth Property	Conservancy	14.81	
SW	Irvingdale Park	Community	15.67	20th & Van Dorn Streets
SW	Maple Lodge Park	Pocket	0.2	S. 20th Street & Euclid Ave.
SW	Marlene Park	Mini	0.25	S. 20th Street & Marlene Dr.
SW	Near South Park	Mini	0.19	S. 19th & A Streets
SW	Peach Park	Mini	0.61	1425 Peach Street
SW	Peterson (Erwin) Park	Community	35.28	4400 Southwood Drive
SW	Pierson Gardens	Garden/Plaza	0.015	S. 33rd Street & Sheridan Blvd.
SW	Pioneers Park	Regional	279.7	S. Coddington Ave. & W. Calvert Street
SW	Pioneers Park Nature Center	Conservancy	668	Within Pioneers Park
SW	Rudge Park	Neighborhood	6	S. 20th & Van Dorn Streets
SW	Sawyer Snell Park	Community	88	S. 2nd & South Streets
SW	Schaefer Tract	Conservancy	61	Near Roca
SW	Standing Bear Park	Neighborhood	20.86	2400 Park Boulevard
SW	Stransky Park	Neighborhood	1	S. 17th Street & Harrison Ave.
SW	Van Dorn Park	Neighborhood	28	S. 9th & Van Dorn Streets
SW	Vavrina Park	Mini	0.25	S. 16th Street & Annette Lane
SW	Wilderness Park	Conservancy	1472.3	S. 1st - S. 27th Street / Van Dorn - Saltillo Rd.
SW	Woodsdale Islands	Boulevard	2.5	Woodsdale Blvd., 22nd to 27th Streets
