= Salt Creek Dams =

Water resource project in Nebraska, U.S.

The Salt Creek Dams, (officially The Salt Creek and Tributaries Flood Control Project) are a U.S. Army Corps of Engineers water resource development project located in southeastern Nebraska near Lincoln, Nebraska, the state capitol. The project was authorized by the Federal Flood Control Act of 1958 to provide flood damage reduction, water quality, recreation, and fish and wildlife enhancement. The basin drains a 1645 square mile area of southeastern Nebraska, encompassing the City of Lincoln. Salt Creek enters the Platte River from the right bank 25 miles southwest of Omaha, Nebraska and drains the southern and western part of the basin, while Wahoo Creek drains the northeastern portion. The lakes are a part of the Missouri River basin.

== Recreation and Wildlife ==
The project impounded ten reservoirs, known as the Salt Creek Lakes, and provide many water-based recreational opportunities for local residents as well as providing wildlife habitat. These projects cover 11,239 acres, of which 4,289 are surface acres of water. The Corps of Engineers leases all but one of its Salt Creek Reservoirs to the Nebraska Game and Parks Commission. Holmes Lake is leased to the City of Lincoln, Nebraska.

== See also ==
- U.S. Army Corps of Engineers
- Nebraska Game and Parks Commission
- Lincoln, Nebraska
- Platte River
- Missouri River
- Flood Control Act
