= Antelope Valley Project =

Public works project in Lincoln, Nebraska, United States

The Antelope Valley Project was a flood management, economic development, and transportation project centered on a flood control channel for Antelope Creek in downtown Lincoln, Nebraska. The $246 million endeavor, the largest public works project in city history, was a partnership between the University of Nebraska–Lincoln, the City of Lincoln, and the Lower Platte South Natural Resources District.

== Project ==
An expansive public works project centered on the Antelope Valley channel, which runs along the east edge of the University of Nebraska–Lincoln's City Campus, was proposed as early as the 1990s to protect the campus and surrounding community from a 100-year flood. After clearing dozens of homes and businesses, work on the Antelope Valley Project began in the mid-2000s and was completed by 2012. In 2015, Lincoln experienced its worst flood in decades, with the Antelope Creek waterway performing as intended.

Though flood control was the project's primary goal, additional aspects sought to create a fresh aesthetic and provide critical infrastructure to downtown Lincoln. This included the addition of a green belt of parkland around the creek, vehicular and pedestrian bridges, roadways to improve traffic flow, and miles of recreational trails. Residential, office, and retail complexes were constructed, primarily in the area of Vine Street to O Street along the channel.

=== Union Plaza ===
Union Plaza is a 6-acre (24,000 m^{2}) urban park that runs along each side of the waterway from O Street to R Street. The $4.75-million park, completed in September 2012, includes the Lincoln Amphitheater, a water plaza with fountains and ponds, festival areas, play areas, sculptures, and a scenic overlook. Restaurants, shops, offices, and housing have been constructed around the plaza, located just southeast of the University of Nebraska–Lincoln's City Campus.

=== Roadways and recreational trails ===
The construction of Antelope Valley Parkway added a six-lane traffic way running along the west side of the waterway. Bridges cross the channel at nine points, providing access to City Campus on the west and Nebraska Innovation Campus and the Bob Devaney Sports Center on the east. Antelope Valley Parkway runs approximately 3.5 miles (5.6 km), connecting to Cornhusker Highway on the north. At S Street, the arterial breaks away from the channel and follows 19th Street southward, connecting Antelope Valley Parkway with Capitol Parkway.

Running parallel to the parkway, pedestrian walkways and trails provide extensive walking and biking trails. Trails extend the length of the channel, connecting to Union Plaza, channel bridge crossings, Nebraska Innovation Campus and the Devaney Center, and City Campus, as well as other trails in the Lincoln network.

=== Project aesthetic ===
The project created a sprawling "green belt" along the Antelope Creek waterway. Wave themes, curves, and circles were used in paving, ponds, the amphitheater, and on retaining walls to create a "nautical theme." Landscaping features low water and maintenance vegetation, with deciduous and evergreen trees lining trails and roadways. The overall aesthetic of the project and its surrounding areas was considered postmodern.
