= Dee Creek (Salt Creek tributary) =

- Location within Nebraska

Location
- Country: United States
- State: Nebraska
- County: Cass County

Physical characteristics
- Source
  - coordinates: 40.8608328°N 96.4016766°W
- Mouth
  - coordinates: 40°57′27″N 96°27′21″W

Dee Creek is a tributary of Salt Creek in Cass County in the U.S. state of Nebraska. Not much is known about Dee Creek, as much of it is underground. It is speculated that Dee Creek is fed directly from the Ogallala Aquifer.
