= Fountain Springs Park =

Coordinates: 42.613°N 91.310°W

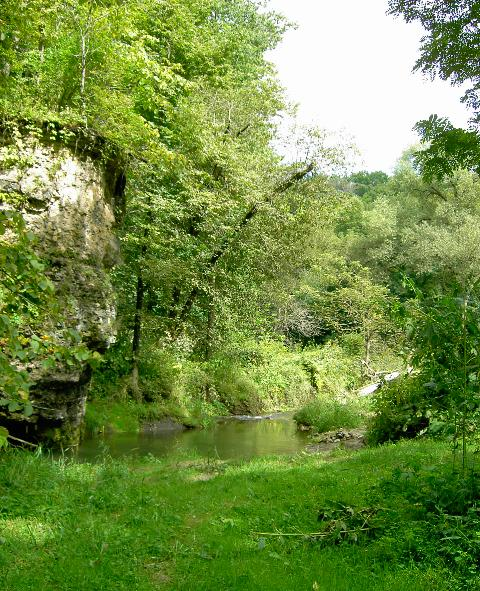
Fountain Springs Park in Delaware County, Iowa.

Fountain Springs Park is a 240-acre wilderness park, located in Delaware County, Iowa, United States.

The park is operated by the Delaware County Conservation Board; it includes hiking trails, picnic and camping areas, and more than a mile of Elk Creek on which visitors are permitted to fish for trout. Facilities also include RV parking and toilets. Although there is room for RVs, the dirt road is tricky especially after a rain.

== Gallery ==
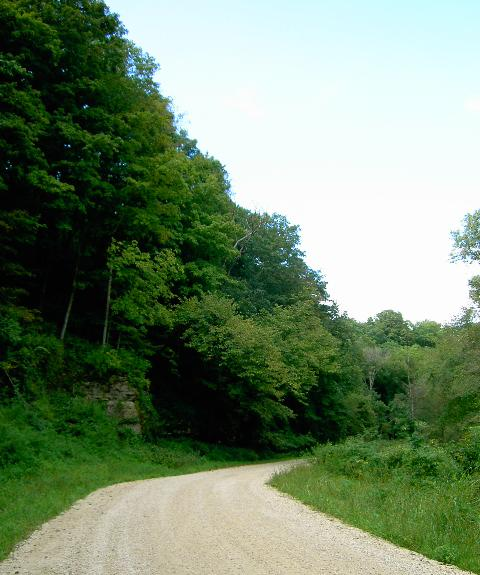

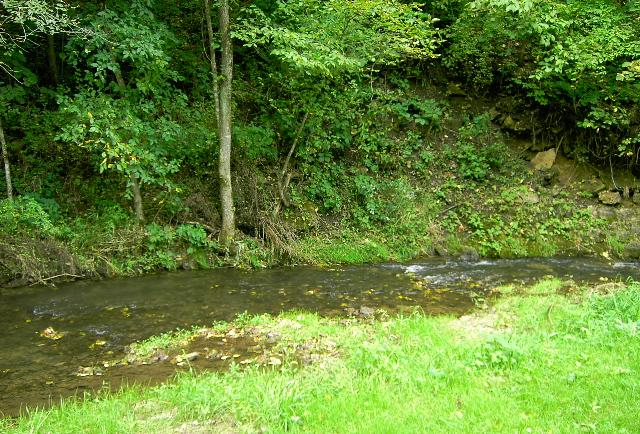

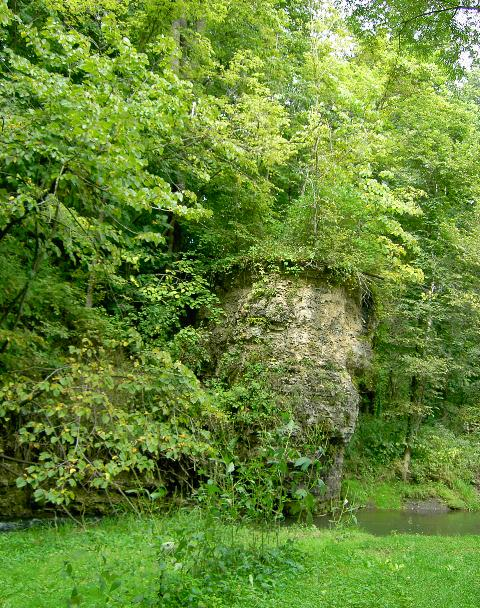

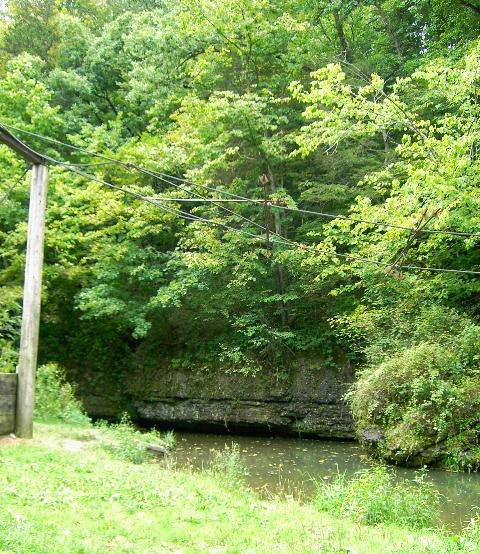

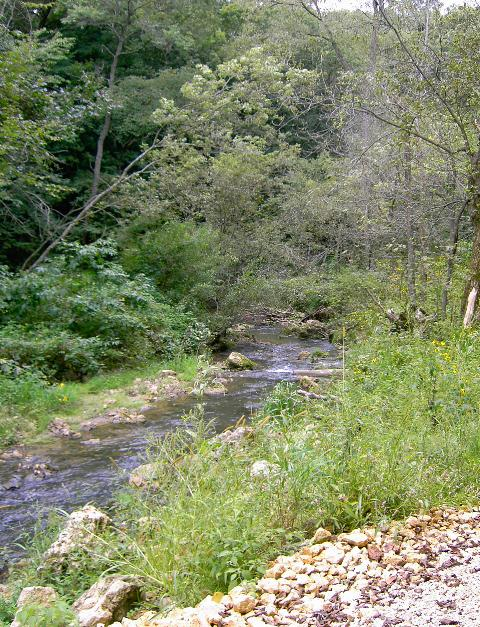
