= Stevens Creek (Salt Creek) =

Coordinates: 40.8850001°N 96.6083458°W

Location
- Country: United States
- State: Nebraska

Physical characteristics
- Mouth: Salt Creek

Basin features
- Progression: Salt Creek → Platte River → Missouri River → Mississippi River

Stevens Creek is a waterway near Lincoln in eastern Nebraska in the Great Plains region of the United States. Stevens Creek is a tributary of Salt Creek which is itself a tributary of the Platte River.

== See also ==
- List of rivers of Nebraska
