= Salt Creek (Platte River tributary) =

River in Cass, Lancaster, and Saunders counties in Nebraska, United States

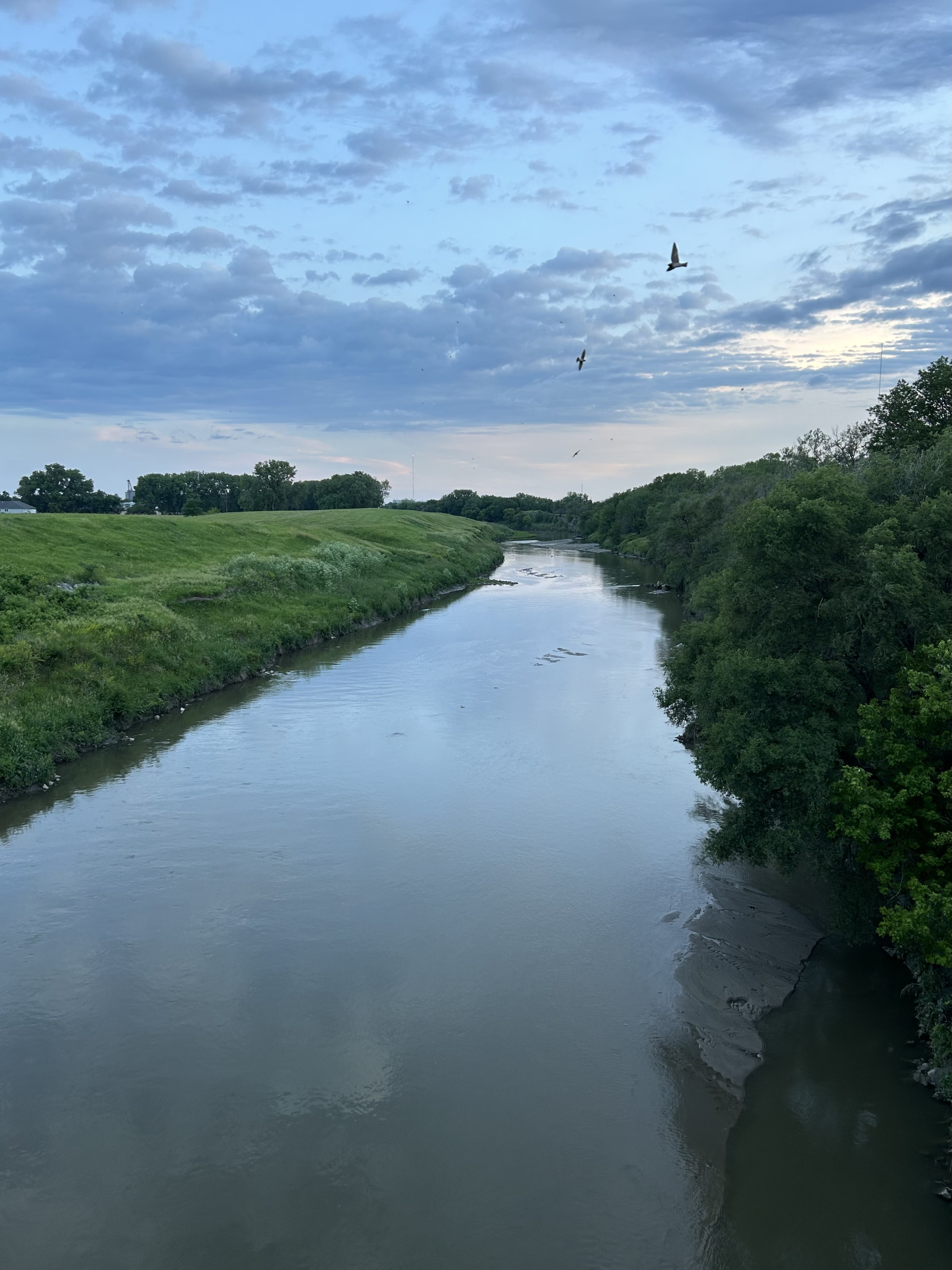
- Salt Creek as seen from the Superior Street Trail, around 38th & Superior in Lincoln, NE.

Location
- Country: United States
- State: Nebraska
- Region: Great Plains
- City: Lincoln

Physical characteristics
- Mouth: Platte River
  - location: Mahoney State Park, Ashland, Saunders County, Nebraska, United States
  - coordinates: 41°02′08″N 96°18′42″W
  - elevation: 1,040 ft (320 m)
- Discharge
  - location: near Ashland
  - average: 476 cu ft/s (13.5 m^{3}/s)

Basin features
- River system: Platte River basin

Salt Creek (Pawnee: Káʾit Kiicuʾ) is a tributary of the Platte River, located in Saunders, Cass, and Lancaster counties in southeast Nebraska. It is approximately 44.38 miles (71.42 km) in length. Salt Creek begins in southern Lancaster county and flows north to connect to the Platte River at Mahoney State Park in Ashland.

== Ecology ==
An 1861 account of Salt Creek in the vicinity of Lincoln by W.W. Cox noted its salinity, the smell of which he described as akin to "the morning breezes at the ocean beach." Cox also reported that "elk and antelope were plentiful," and that the river was "wonderfully supplied with fish."

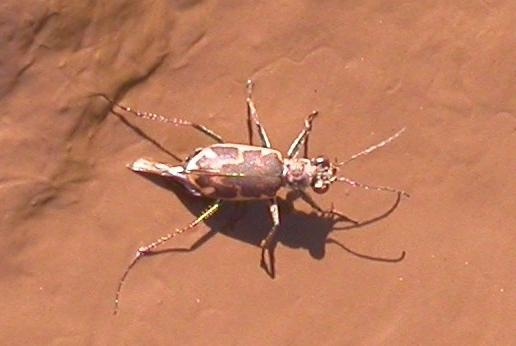
Salt Creek Tiger Beetle

Salt Creek, as with all other saline wetlands in southeast Nebraska, is imparted with its salinity due to the porous nature of the Dakota sandstone through which it flows. The salt in the region is ultimately sourced from Cretaceous-era shale which was deposited when Nebraska was part of a vast inland ocean known as the Western Interior Seaway.

The water quality and biodiversity of Salt Creek are greatly impacted by its proximity to the city of Lincoln. Salt Creek was channelized in an effort to reduce flooding in the city, which causes the stream to discharge water at a much faster rate. The change of flow combined with the dumping of treated sewage and urban runoff create a stream that is essentially devoid of life after it leaves the city of Lincoln.

Among species found along Salt Creek are the critically endangered Salt Creek tiger beetle, of which fewer than 200 individuals existed in 2009.

== Tributaries of Salt Creek ==
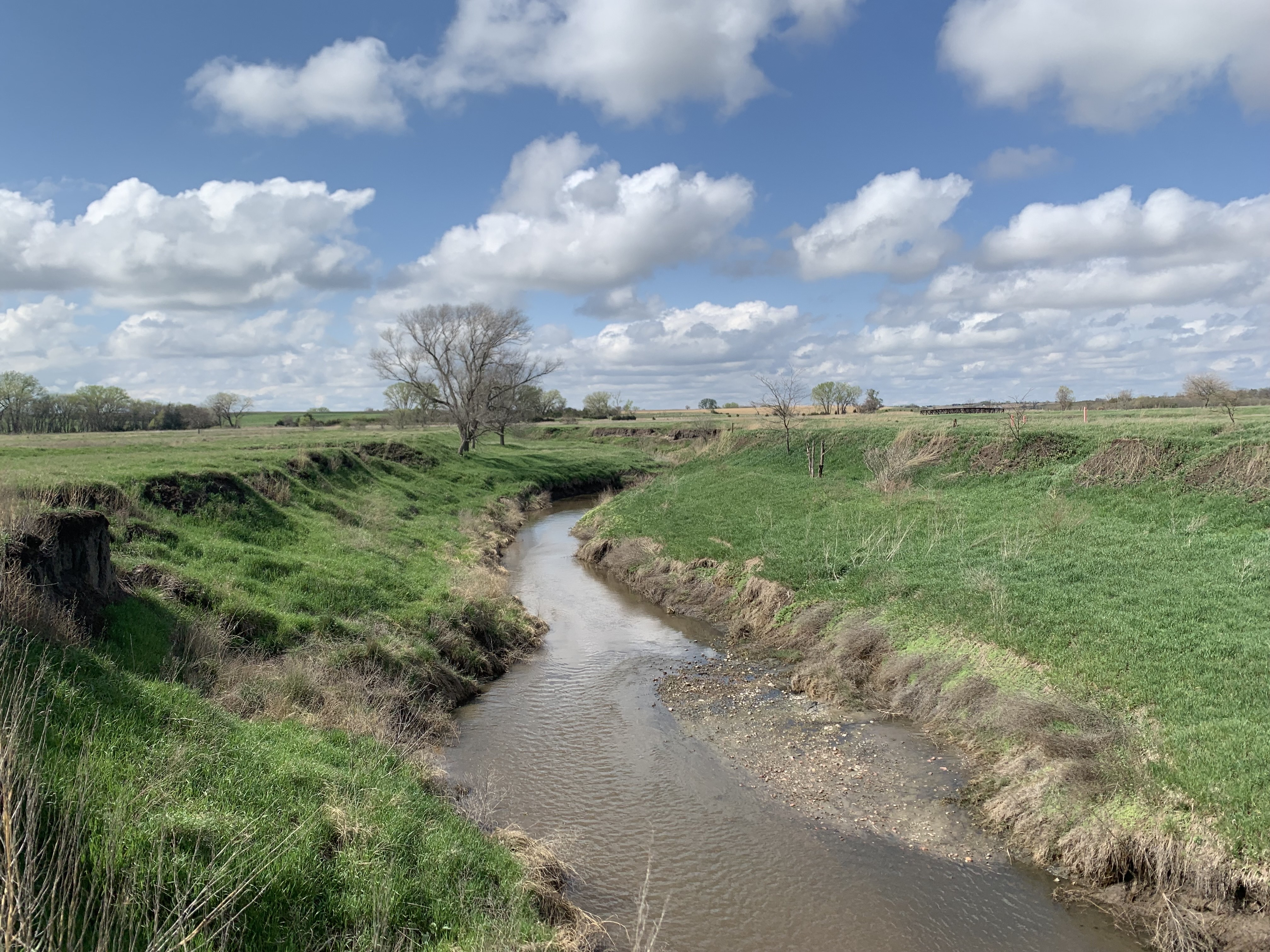
Little Salt Creek, a tributary of Salt Creek.

Salt Creek has fifteen tributaries of its own: Oak Creek, Stevens Creek, Middle Creek, Antelope Creek, Elk Creek, Beal Slough, Haines Branch, Cardwell Branch, Lynn Creek, Deadman's Run, Little Salt Creek, Rock Creek, Camp Creek, Wahoo Creek, and Dee Creek.

== See also ==
- List of rivers of Nebraska
- List of tributaries of the Missouri River
- Wilderness Park
- Capitol Beach Lake
