= Antelope Creek (Salt Creek) =

Stream in Nebraska, U.S.

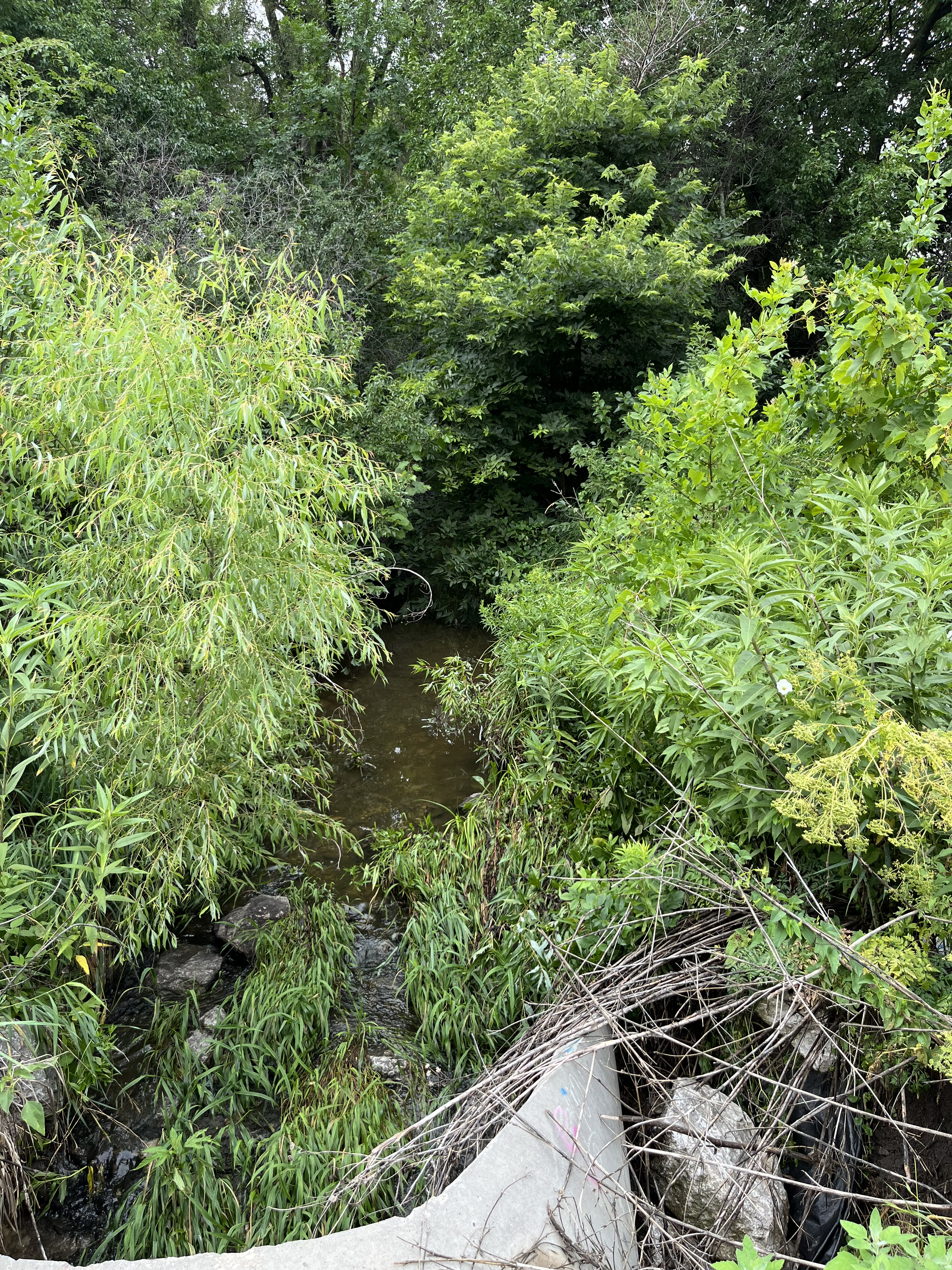
- Looking upstream at Antelope Creek near its source in southern Lincoln.

Location
- Country: United States
- Region: Great Plains
- State: Nebraska
- County: Lancaster
- City: Lincoln

Physical characteristics
- Source
  - location: Mendoza Park, Lincoln, Lancaster County, Nebraska, United States
  - coordinates: 40°44′25″N 96°35′21.05″W
- Mouth: Salt Creek
  - location: Lincoln, Lancaster County, Nebraska, United States
  - coordinates: 40°50′4″N 96°41′59.06″W

Antelope Creek is a stream in Lancaster County, Nebraska which flows for 11 miles through Lincoln, Nebraska. It is a tributary of Salt Creek, itself a tributary of the Platte River.

== See also ==
- Antelope Valley Project

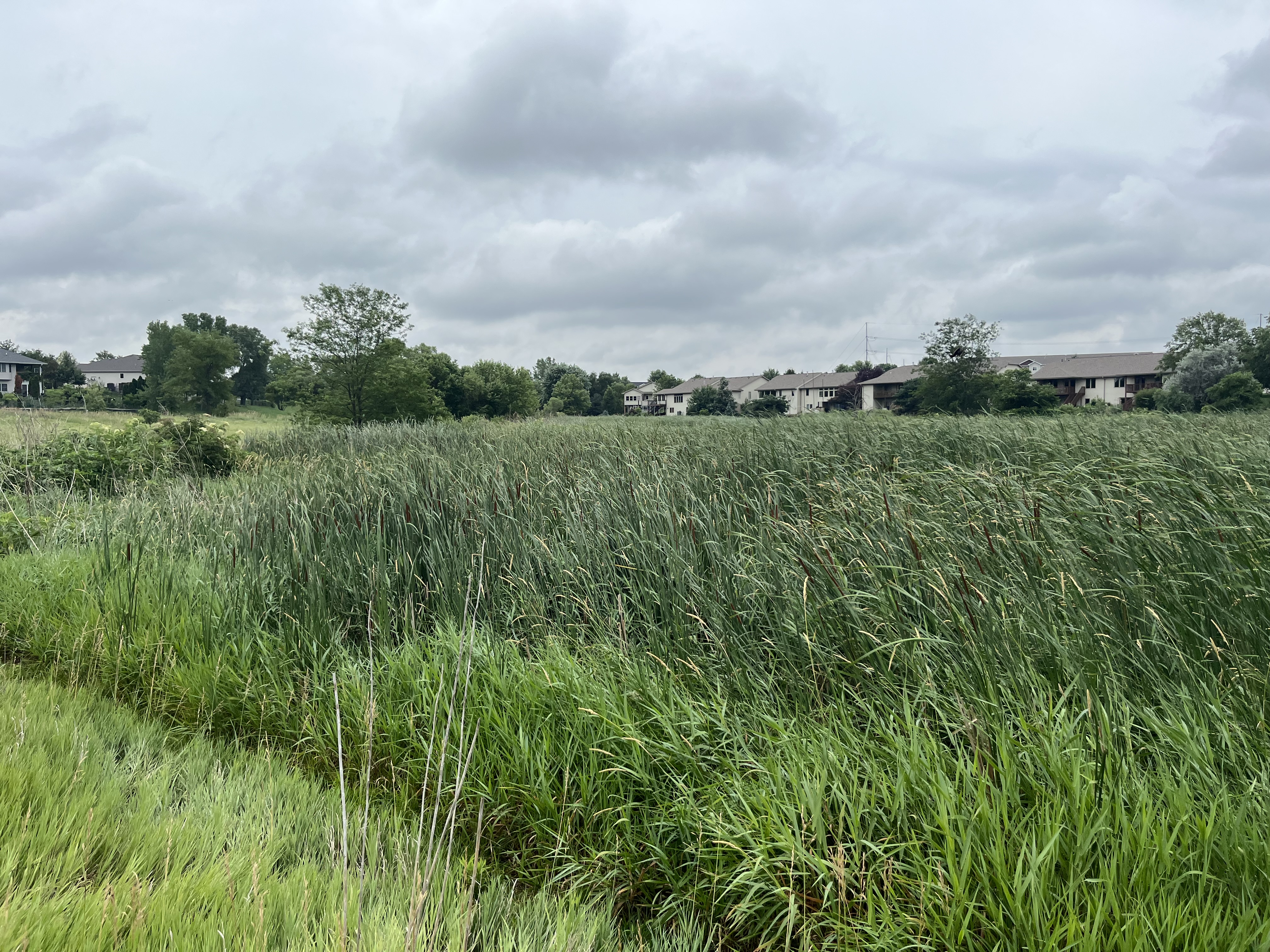
A wetland near the southern source of Antelope Creek.

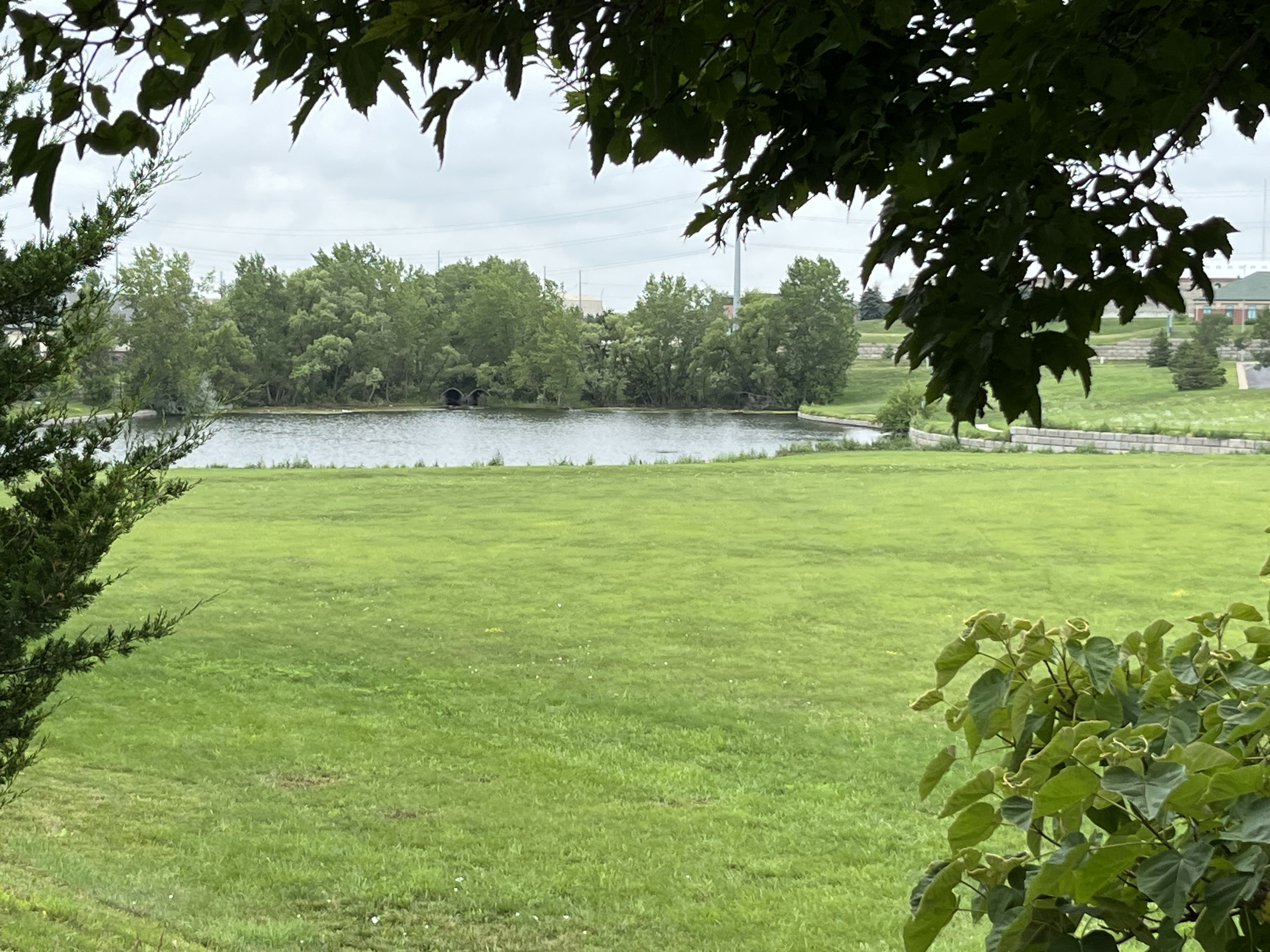
This man-made lake is the source of Antelope Creek. The original source was located nearby but has been destroyed by a housing development.
