= Capitol Beach Lake =

- Salt Lake
- Location within Nebraska Location within the United States
- Location: Lancaster County, Nebraska
- Coordinates: 40°49′30″N 96°44′28″W
- Type: lake
- Basin countries: United States
- Surface area: 300 acres (120 ha)
- Surface elevation: 1,142 ft (348 m)

Capitol Beach Lake (also known as Salt Lake) is a 300 acres (120 ha) private lake in west Lincoln, Nebraska. The lake is managed by the Capitol Beach Community Association.

== Description ==
Capitol Beach Lake is located roughly three miles west of Downtown Lincoln and is surrounded by permanent residences as well as summer homes and rental properties. From the lake, the Capitol Building can be clearly seen as well as the skyline of Downtown Lincoln. Summertime activities at the lake include swimming, boating, sailing, fishing, water-skiing, and jet skiing.

Wildlife in the area includes blue herons, waterfowl, minks, pheasants, deer, and foxes. This fauna is supported both by the lake and the Saline Wetland Park, a public park managed jointly by the Capitol Beach Community Association and the Lower Platte South Natural Resources District. While there is no public beach access to the lake itself, the Saline Wetland Park features nature trails which are open to the public allowing for observation of these species.

== History ==
=== Saline wetlands before settlement ===
Prior to the settlement of Lincoln, the land was home to numerous saline wetlands. These wetlands were supported by Salt Creek, a tributary of the Platte.

Approaching Lincoln from the east, the first remarkable object that meets the eye of the stranger is a succession of what appears to be several beautiful lakes extending along the lines of Salt Creek to the northward and westward of the town, the nearest a mile distant. As their crystal surfaces glisten like molten silver in the sunlight the illusion is complete, and the most critical landscape painter would be deceived as to their character. But there is no water enclosed in their grassy banks . . .

These apparent lakes are the Salt Basins of Lancaster County, in themselves natural curiosities well worthy of a long journey to visit them. The floor of these basins is hard clay, smooth and level as a brick-yard and polished as that of a Hollander’s kitchen. They are covered with a white layer of crystallized salt, wonderfully pure . . . Intersecting these salt floors are little streams of salty water, so strongly impregnated that it will abrade the tongue and lips when tasted.

Upon the west side of Salt Creek the whole surface of the soil for two or three miles around the basins is covered with salt . . . Salt Creek itself is, as the name implies, a briny stream, and when the vicinity of the basins shall become a fashionable watering place, salt water baths will be indulged in without danger from hungry sharks or receding water.

—Nebraska Commonwealth (Lincoln), September 7, 1867

These wetlands were an important part of the ecosystem, bringing both wildlife and people to the area as a source of salt.

As we viewed the land upon which now stands this great busy city, we had the exciting pleasure of seeing for the first time a large drove of beautiful antelope, cantering across the prairie about where the government square is (9th and O streets). We forded Salt Creek, just by the junction of Oak Creek, and what a struggle we had in making our way through the tall sunflowers between the ford and the basin. There was something enchanting about the scene that met our eyes. The fresh breeze sweeping over the salt basins reminded us of the morning breezes at the ocean beach.

—W. W. Cox, 1888, describing the Lincoln landscape of July 1861

The area which would later be known as Capitol Beach Lake was the largest of these salt basins and the confluence of several streams.

The Great Basin [Capitol Beach Lake] covers an area of about 400 acres. The brine issues from a large number of places all over the surface, but in small quantities. All the salt water that comes to the surface from this basin unites in one stream, and we estimate the entire amount of water that flowed from this basin at from six to eight gallons per minute. The second salt basin lies between Oak and Salt creeks and covers an area of two hundred acres. The third basin is on Little Salt Creek, called Kenosha Basin, and covers two hundred acres. Numerous small basins occur on Middle Creek, which occupy in all about six hundred acres. Between Middle and Salt creeks are several small basins, covering 40 or 50 acres. From the surface of all these basins more or less springs ooze out.

—F. V. Hayden, First Annual Report of the United States Geological Survey of the Territories, Embracing Nebraska, 1867

=== Settlement period ===
Prior to being chosen as the site of the Nebraska State Capitol, the area immediately surrounding the Salt Lake was populated only by the small village of Lancaster, which had a total population of thirty individuals. Most of these residents were involved in salt gathering. Proposed salt production capabilities played a role, along with regional politics, in the selection of Lancaster as the state capitol, with The Nebraska Commonwealth, a newspaper which strongly supported the selection of Lancaster for the state capital, arguing that salt gathering provided such a business opportunity that "a town of great commercial importance is bound to be located on Salt Creek."

Salt production soared early on, with one company producing 125,000 pounds of salt in 1866 alone. However, it was believed that the salt industry would only be truly viable if a "mother lode" were found. Beginning in 1869, several wells were drilled to find an underground source of salt, all of which were unsuccessful. The salinity of Salt Creek is caused by ancient shale from the Cretaceous period, when the area was covered by ocean. Salt Creek, unlike most rivers in Nebraska, flows northeast and the tributaries which provide its salinity lie roughly thirteen miles northeast of Lincoln. Once it was realized that Salt Lake and Salt Creek did not contain a "mother lode," Lincoln began expanding eastward toward freshwater sources and away from the frequently-flooding Salt Creek.

In 1895, entrepreneurs diked the east end of the Salt Lake basin and diverted nearby Oak Creek into it. This altered the basin from an ephemeral wetland to a permanent saltwater lake. The lake was marketed as a resort with steamboat excursions, pavilions, bathhouses, and restaurants. The area was named "Burlington Beach" because of the Burlington Railroad line which carried passengers from Lincoln to the beach.

=== 20th century to present ===
By 1906, the original owners had sold the park due to dwindling visitors caused by a leak in the dike which had depleted the lake of its water. The sale had resulted in a new name for the lake, Capital Beach, which later became Capitol Beach. Capitol Beach changed hands several times. The city of Lincoln considered, but ultimately decided against, buying the property and incorporating it as a public park. The Lincoln State Journal chastised the city for their decision:

Anyone with a spark of imagination cannot help viewing with enthusiasm the prospect of Capital Beach as a part of the city's park system. Here is Lincoln in the midst of a level plain, without rugged scenery and without a river. It seems like a special providence that at its very gates there should be a lake a mile long and a mile wide which could be made into a free vacation resort for the entire city. This lake, surrounded by trees and walks and drives, as it would be, and with ample park space on all sides is undoubtedly the city's greatest potential natural asset.

—Lincoln State Journal, August 2, 1915

Until 1958, Capitol Beach operated as a privately owned amusement park, featuring a saltwater pool and dance hall. However, Lincoln had begun to see wetlands as a threat due to fear that they were breeding grounds for mosquitos. In a process that also resulted in the destruction of a majority of Lincoln's natural saline wetlands, Salt Lake was drained in 1958 so that Interstate 80 could pass through it. Portions of the lake were refilled using water pumped from Oak Creek, resulting in Capitol Beach Lake and Oak Lake.

In the 1990s, the Lower Platte South Natural Resources District began restoring elements of the saline wetlands which had previously dominated the area. This area, the Saline Wetlands Nature Center, is located east of Capitol Beach and is open to the public as a place to view now-rare saline wetlands and the animal and plant species which live in them.

== See also ==
- History of Lincoln, Nebraska
- Geography of Nebraska
- Neighborhoods in Lincoln, Nebraska
- Saline Wetlands Conservation Partnership
- Salt mining
- Salt production
- Western Interior Seaway
