= Nebraska's Centennial Mall =

Public mall in Lincoln, Nebraska, U.S.

Centennial Mall
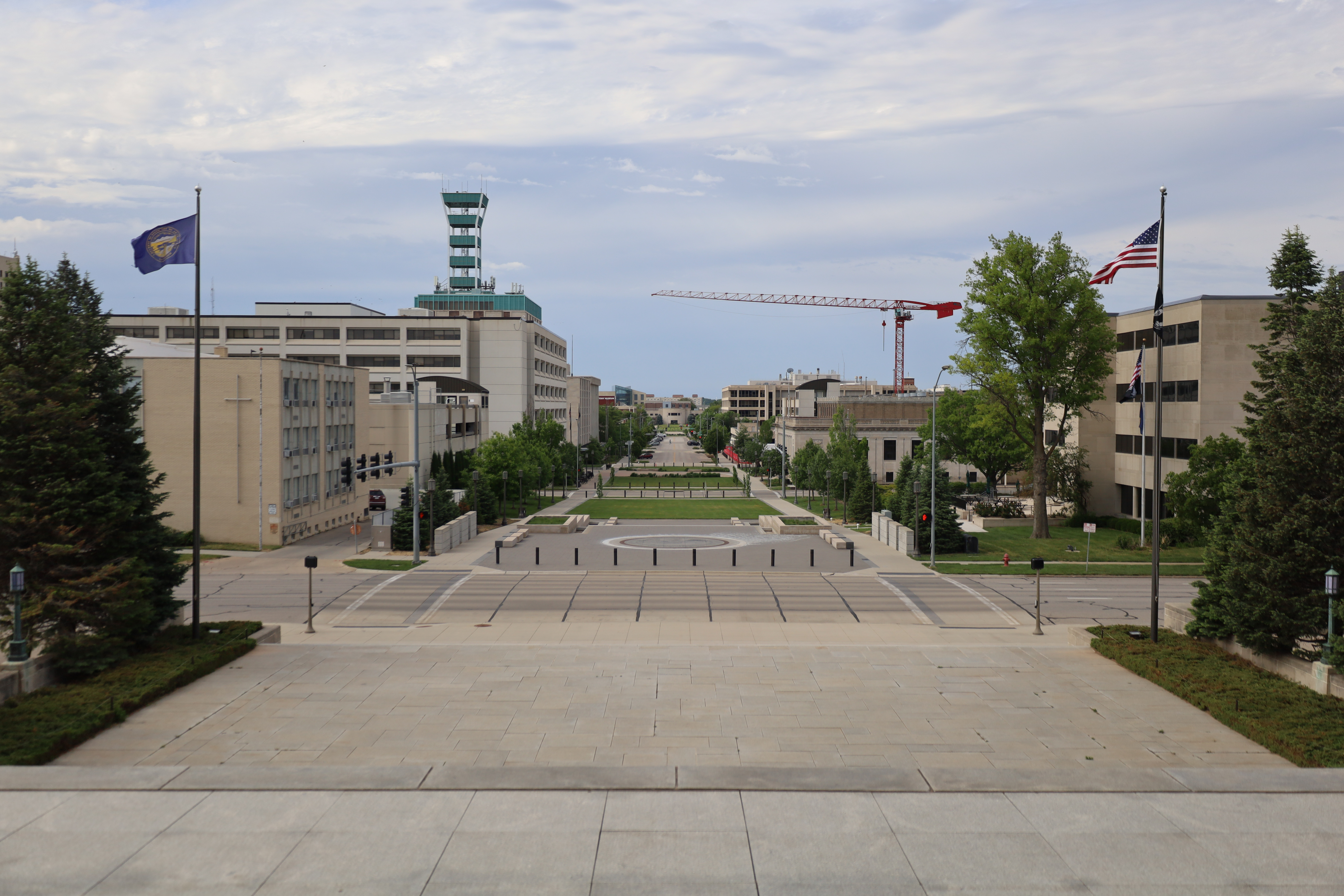
- Centennial Mall in 2025
- Interactive map of Centennial Mall
- Type: Municipal park
- Location: 201-301 Centennial Mall S., Lincoln, Nebraska, U.S.
- Coordinates: 40.811131263389264°N 96.69971261343763°W
- Opened: 1969
- Owner: City of Lincoln

Nebraska's Centennial Mall, also known simply as Centennial Mall, is a seven-block-long public space in Lincoln, Nebraska, United States. It stretches northwards from the Nebraska State Capitol to the University of Nebraska - Lincoln's city campus. The mall was originally envisioned in 1922, during the construction of the capitol. Federal, state, and city officials formally dedicated the 15th Street Mall on July 22, 1972, and the Lincoln City Council adopted an ordinance to rename the expanse Centennial Mall, in honor of the State of Nebraska's 1967 centennial, on December 18, 1972. The mall later fell into disrepair, until it was renovated in 2016.

== History ==
In 1922, the architect of the Nebraska State Capitol, Bertram Goodhue, proposed a seven-block-long avenue to create a more formal approach to the Capitol's north entrance. Fifteen years later in 1937, the city and state designated a 120-foot-wide right of way from the Capitol to the University of Nebraska - Lincoln campus and created a commission to begin work on the mall. Major construction was completed in 1969, though finishing touches were not completed until 1972.

From 1969 onwards, the mall remained largely unchanged but fell into a state of disrepair. By 2009 it was "ready for a major update". In order to enhance the visual beauty, ease of pedestrian use, and accessibility of the space, the Lincoln Parks Foundation began raising money to renovate Centennial Mall in that year. Through both public and private funding, the project was completed by Clark Enersen Partners in 2016.

== Description ==
Following the $19.6 million renovation completed in 2016, Centennial Mall features many interactive and educational opportunities, including plaques with QR codes which can be scanned to learn more about industries, important figures, and historical sites. The space was divided into three zones, each exploring a different theme related to Nebraska: Civic, Community, and Campus.

=== Civic Zone ===
This area of Centennial Mall explores the themes of "We the People" and "Our Home Nebraska". "We the People", which extends from K to L Streets, is a large, formal plaza with elements that celebrate the democratic process, watchful citizens, and state leaders. "Our Home Nebraska", from L to M Streets, focuses on the geographic features, natural resources, and stewardship of the land of Nebraska. The major rivers and ecoregions of the state are represented through a large outline of the state in the pavement.

=== Community Zone ===
The three central blocks of Centennial Mall, which stretch from M to P Streets, are open to automobile traffic and focus on the "Community Mosaic of Nebraskans". The sidewalks in this area have been widened to allow donors to inscribe paving stones with the names of individuals, families, communities, and organizations from Nebraska.

=== Campus Zone ===
The final two blocks of Centennial Mall, from P to R Streets, are called "Sparking the Good Life". Features here reflect the importance of the University of Nebraska in shaping both Lincoln and Nebraska as a whole. This space celebrates innovators, educators, and artists from Nebraska. Housed between the College of Journalism and Mass Communications and the Lincoln Children's Museum, this area features an art alcove, water features, and an amphitheater to celebrate and encourage creativity and artistic expression.

=== Standing Bear statue ===
In 2017, a ten-foot-tall statue honoring Chief Standing Bear of the Ponca Tribe was unveiled on Centennial Mall in the Campus Zone. The bronze Standing Bear statue, created by Benjamin Victor, references the "Standing Lincoln" statue memorializing Abraham Lincoln which stands in front of the Nebraska State Capitol building. The unveiling ceremony featured dancers from the Winnebago Tribe, a dedication by mayor Chris Beutler, a reception following the event, and a sale of the artist's maquettes of the statue to benefit a Native American scholarship fund.

== See also ==
- Lincoln, Nebraska
- History of Nebraska
- History of Lincoln, Nebraska
- University of Nebraska–Lincoln
