= Jamaica North Trail =

Coordinates: 40°41′50.79″N 96°41′18.19″W

The Jamaica North Trail is a 6.5-mile-long (10.5 km) pedestrian and cycling trail running through southwest Lincoln, Nebraska, USA.

== Description ==
According to an October 2003 press release, the city of Lincoln purchased an 8.2-mile (13.2 km) railway segment for $605,000. Construction began in May 2006, the groundbreaking ceremony took place in mid-June 2006, and the trail itself was slated to open in late October 2006.

The majority of the trail runs directly through Wilderness Park, a wooded area covering more than 1,475 acres (5.97 km^{2}), which already featured a "recreational" (dirt) trail system of over 22 miles (35 km). The Jamaica North trail connects to the Homestead Trail, which will ultimately extend 72 miles (116 km) from Lincoln's Haymarket District to Marysville, Kansas.

The trail's surface is composed of crushed limestone and asphalt.

The Jamaica North Trail follows the path of an abandoned Union Pacific Railroad segment which ran through the historic town of Jamaica, Nebraska, near Saltillo Road.

== See also ==
- MoPac Trail
- Wilderness Park
- Rails-to-Trails Conservancy
- Union Pacific Railroad
- History of rail transport in the United States
- History of Lincoln, Nebraska
- Trails in Lincoln, Nebraska
