= Wilderness Park =

Biggest natural park in Lincoln

Wilderness Park is a 1,472-acre (596 ha) mostly-public conservancy located in southwest Lincoln, Nebraska. The park is the largest in Lincoln and is separated into several branches. S 14th St, a north–south street dissects much of the south end of the park.

== Description ==
Wilderness Park is heavily wooded, but also includes some prairieland. Because of the nature of the unrestricted flow of the Salt Creek in this area, the lay of the park changes over time. Flooding and erosion, as well as seasonal fluctuation in the flow of the streams in the area, mean that land that is perfectly dry in midsummer or midwinter becomes completely inundated and impassible in Spring or Fall.

Boundaries are S 1st St on the west, S 27th St on the east, Van Dorn St on the north and Saltillo Rd on the south - however, not nearly all of the land between these boundaries resides in the park. The park is much wider in the southern segments. Among smaller streams, Beal Slough, a primary tributary to Salt Creek, passes through Wilderness Park.

Wildlife in the area includes foxes, deer, raccoons, opossums, frogs, hawks, owls, songbirds, and squirrels, as well as small fish and aquatic invertebrates. It is possible that the area may support larger carnivores such as coyotes, but evidence of this remains to be seen.

Wilderness Park features a vast network of dirt walking trails, single-track biking trails, and horse trails. Each trail type is denoted by signs along the trails. The hiking trail was designated part of the National Recreation Trails Program in 1977.

The crushed limestone 6.5-mile Jamaica North Trail is mostly located within the park. South of Saltillo Rd, Jamaica North connects to the Homestead Trail corridor, which as of July 2012 reaches to Beatrice, Nebraska, and will ultimately extend to Marysville, Kansas.

== History ==
=== Lincoln Park ===
In 1866, the southern portion of the land that would become Wilderness Park supported a corn mill situated on the Salt Creek. Shortly thereafter, a settler named Phillip Cooper dammed the Salt Creek to create a pond for the purpose of making ice in the winter. In 1873, Cooper dug a cave in the area to store the ice during the summer. Cooper sold the land to Lincoln attorney and mayor A.J. Sawyer in 1887. Sawyer rebuilt the dam in concrete in 1900 and opened the area as Lincoln Park.

Some time after this, the land was purchased by the Burlington Railroad to operate Lincoln Park and more importantly to use Salt Creek as a water source for their steam engines. The railroad pumped roughly one million gallons of water from the Salt Creek through a twelve-inch pipe to their roundhouse located southwest of Lincoln.

The first Boy Scouts of America troop formed in Nebraska in 1910, quickly becoming immensely popular, and began meeting in Lincoln Park in 1912. In 1916, the park was purchased by Lincoln Traction Co. who used the power generated by the damming of Salt Creek to light the park with arc and incandescent lighting, earning it the nickname Electric Park.

The park was closed in 1935 and leased to the Boy Scouts Cornhusker Council. The Cornhusker Council continued using the park as a campsite, eventually buying the land and renaming it Camp Minis-Kuya. Camp Minis-Kuya later closed.

=== Epworth Park ===
Concurrently in the late 1890s, a Methodist organization called the Epworth Association sought to bring the "camp meeting" style of retreat popularized at Chautauqua, New York, to Nebraska. The Epworth Association held its first retreat in Lincoln Park but subsequently purchased its own 40-acre lot of land directly south of Lincoln Park to develop.

In 1903, the Epworth Association opened Epworth Park selling 1,500 tickets a day in its first week and audiences grew to 5,000. In its first season, Epworth Park made $10,000 of which it donated "$800 - to worn out preachers and $1,000 to Nebraska Wesleyan [a Methodist college near Lincoln]."

By 1915, Epworth Park featured an open-air pavilion which could seat 5,000, a boy scout cabin, and two foot bridges which connected to the man-made island called "Oxford Isle" in the center of the man-made Epworth Lake. Fed by water from the Salt Creek, Epworth Lake allowed park-goers to swim and canoe. Epworth Lake was also the site of the park's "Venetian Nights" in which families could rent ornately-decorated rafts and rowboats to leisurely ride around the lake.

The growing popularity of the park, an average of 3,000 residents at its height, led to the construction of a village of cabins, a 60-room dormitory, and a 150-room hotel, as well as four restaurants, a grocery store, bakery, bookstore, and post office. Burlington and Union Pacific railroads ferried passengers to the park at half-price from Lincoln.

The main focus of the park was religious outreach, but the park also featured animal shows; musical acts such as the U.S. Army Band, Enrico Caruso, and the Swiss bell ringers; magicians; and popular speakers such as Theodore Roosevelt, William Jennings Bryan, Howard Taft, Booker T. Washington, and Billy Sunday.

In 1935, 14 inches of rain fell over the course of one week, causing flooding which destroyed most of the buildings in the park. Unsuccessful efforts were made to reopen the park, but American culture had changed with the advent of cars and mass communication. Families no longer needed to physically attend major speeches or concerts as they could now listen to them on the radio. Similarly, automobiles meant that families could quickly drive wherever they pleased for relatively low cost and no longer relied on the trains and streetcars which had helped to make Epworth Park thrive.

=== Wilderness Park ===
In 1966, Epworth Park was donated to the City of Lincoln. Four years later in 1970, Lancaster County acquired Camp Minis-Kuya (formerly Lincoln Park) for $60,000. Epworth Park, Camp Minis-Kuya, and several other parcels of land in public domain were consolidated to create Wilderness Park. Although vegetation, erosion, flooding, and settling have obscured much of the former features of both Epworth Park and Lincoln Park, evidence of the developments in the area can still be found such as pieces of the concrete dams and metal pipes. Additionally, the original entrance to Epworth Park, a stone archway, can be found on the south side of 1st and Calvert streets at the edge of the park.

=== 1894 Rock Island Railroad Wreck ===
The site of the 1894 Rock Island railroad wreck, an act of sabotage which killed 11, lies within Wilderness Park. The trestle where the derailment occurred passes above the Jamaica North Trail at 40°44′38″N 96°42′45″W.

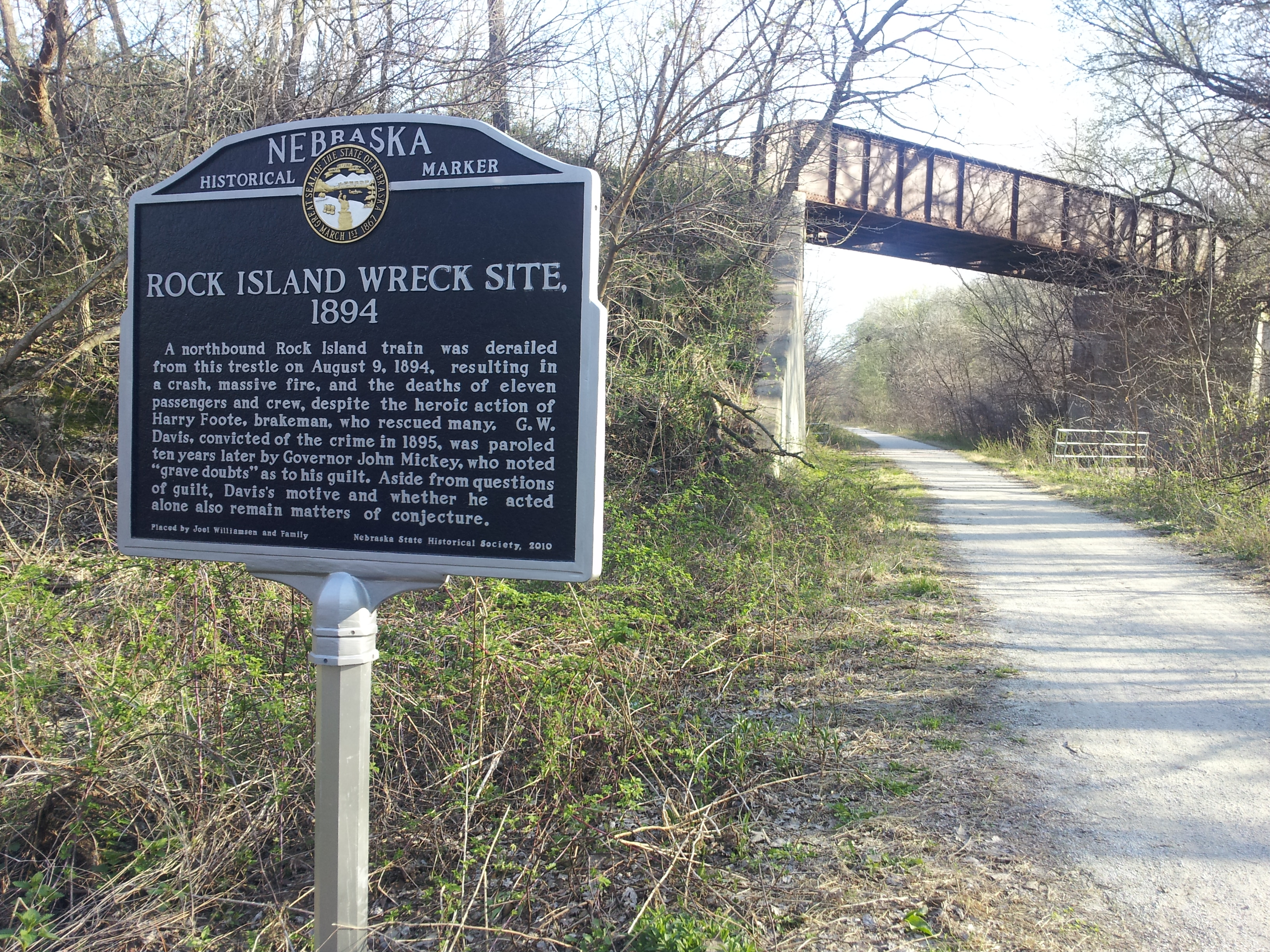
Historical Marker at the site of the 1894 Rock Island Railroad Wreck

=== Bridges ===
Wilderness Park is home to at least a dozen pedestrian bridges of varying architecture and age. In 2010, the center of one bridge in the south end of the park collapsed roughly fifteen feet as around 20 children from a day camp were crossing the structure. Although no one was seriously injured in the fall, the incident prompted a review of all bridges in the park.

== Urban legends ==
Two main urban legends surround Wilderness Park. One legend claims that the ghosts of the 1894 Rock Island Railroad wreck are still present in the park.

The second legend claims that in the early twentieth century, Wilderness Park was a wooded wasteland at the edge of town inhabited by a mysterious old woman. According to the legend, the disappearances of several young children were blamed on the old woman who was deemed a witch before being killed and buried in the park by the townspeople. The story claims that the witch's ghost still haunts the park and her grave must not be disturbed lest she rise again to take revenge.

This legend is actually the plot of an independent film, Wake the Witch (2010), shot and set in Lincoln. The premise of the film--that the area was a largely uninhabited wilderness--is entirely false as most of the area was actually a popular resort with an average of 3,000 residents a day. The remaining portion of the park was owned by an electrical utilities company which lit most of the park with incandescent and arc lighting. Furthermore, there is no evidence that any woman was ever killed for suspected witchcraft or kidnapping in the park. The writer and director of the film have confirmed that the film is entirely fictional.

== See also ==
- Parks in Lincoln, Nebraska
- Jamaica North Trail
- 1894 Rock Island railroad wreck
- History of Lincoln, Nebraska
- Salt Creek (Platte River)
- History of Nebraska
- Chautauqua
- Christian revival
- Protestantism in the United States
