= Sunken Gardens (Nebraska) =

Coordinates: 40°48′08″N 96°40′59″W

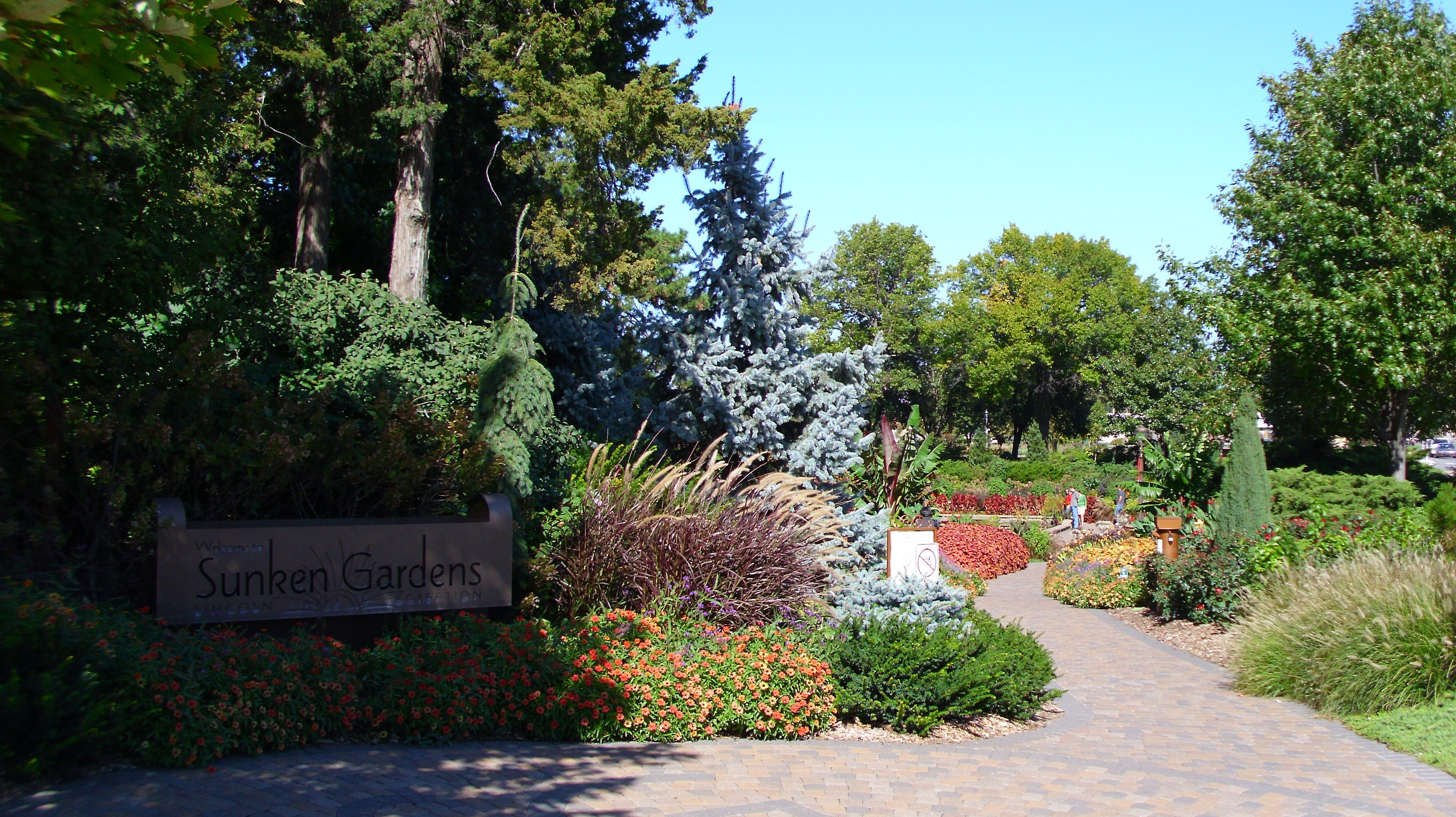
Sunken Gardens entrance in Lincoln

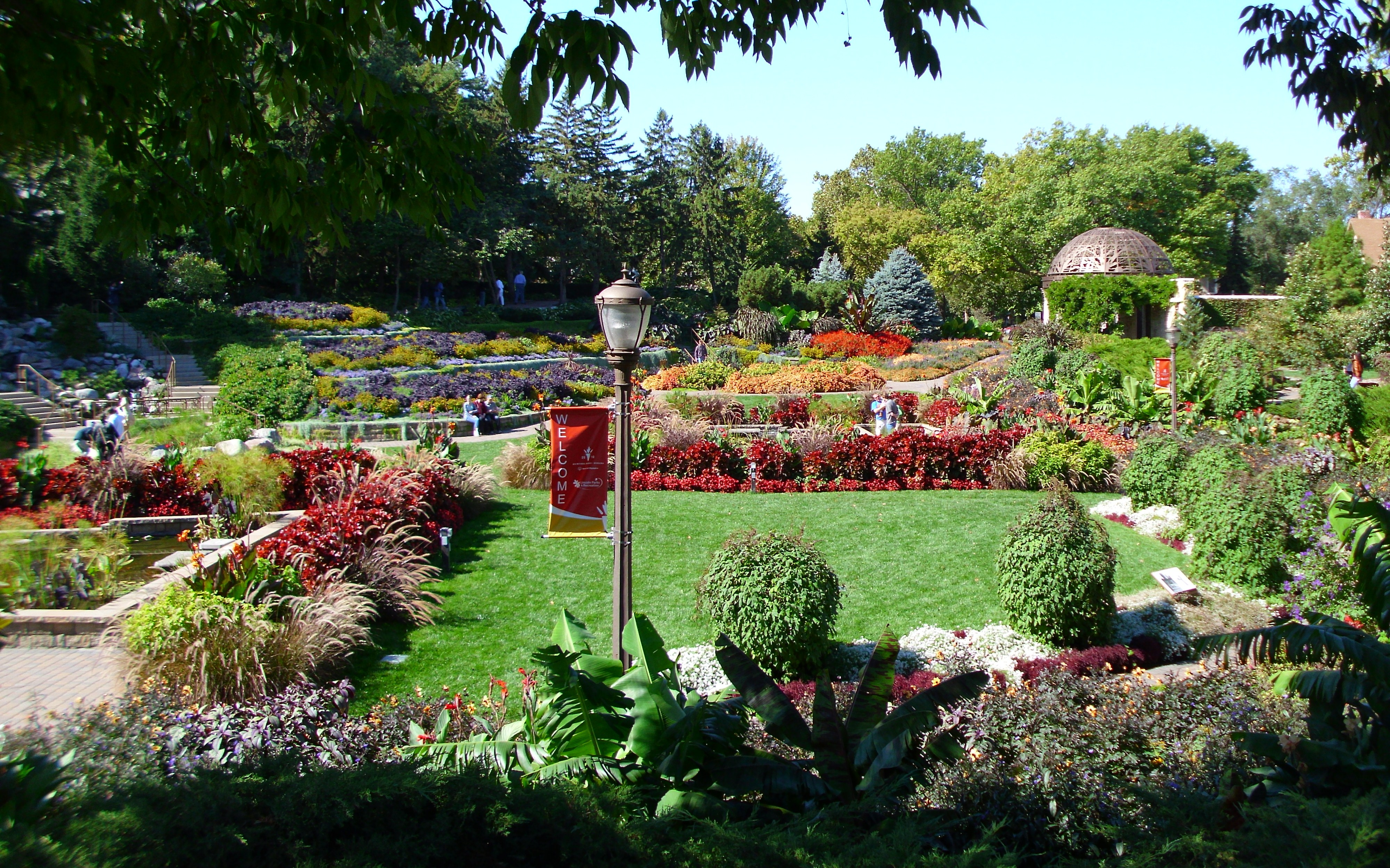
View from 27th St of Sunken Gardens in Lincoln

Koi from the koi ponds

The Sunken Gardens was constructed during the winter of 1930–31 in Lincoln, Nebraska. It is the only garden in Nebraska listed in the National Geographic's Guide to Public Gardens 300 Best Gardens to Visit in the United States and Canada.

== History ==
=== Original construction ===
Construction of the gardens began in 1930 under the direction of Ernest M. Bair as a project for unemployed men during the Great Depression. The 1.5-acre land, which had previously been a neighborhood dumpsite for refuse, was donated by the locally prominent Frey, Faulkner, and Seacrest families.

The City of Lincoln, Parks and Recreation Department owns and maintains the Gardens since its inception. At the time of its construction, the garden featured numerous rock and stone elements, in keeping with the trend of rock gardens at the time. As such, the garden was simply known as the "Rock Garden." Rocks were used to create terraced retaining walls, waterfalls, and water fountains. The project was completed in 1931 and the gardens opened with 416 trees and shrubs planted throughout the one and a half acres of land.

=== Renovation ===
In 2003, renovation of the garden began and was completed in 2005. Lincoln Parks and Recreation saw the future of this community resource and worked to make it grow by collaborating with a local fundraising partner, the Lincoln Parks Foundation, enabling the ability to update facilities and improve access through raising $1.7 million for the renovation and a partial endowment in a "Polishing a Gem" campaign. Ongoing maintenance needs in the Gardens are provided by the City of Lincoln, Parks and Recreation Department, through the Public Gardens District, which also cares for multiple public gardens throughout the Lincoln community as part of the local government.

The renovation included the addition of two new statues and construction of the Rotary Pavilion attached to the restrooms. The original Rebekah at the Well statue by Ellis Burman was replaced by artist David Young's "Rebekah at the Well." Dr. Wayne Southwick's statue "Reville", standing in the Healing Garden, depicts his wife Ann getting the children out of bed and ready for the day. The Rotary Pavilion includes a dome designed by architect Jeffrey Chadwick. The dome is made of individual laser cut panels representing the four seasons of Lincoln's skyline.

== Donation programs ==
To continue to reinvest in the Gardens, there are two programs community members can donate to; the "One Flower Forever" and "Paving the Path" programs. By donating 100 dollars to the One Flower Forever program, a "forever" flower will be planted in Sunken Gardens in honor of someone of the donor's choice. The "forever" flower is annually planted in Sunken Gardens forever. The donor then gets a certificate, and the names of honorees are recorded in the interactive kiosk at the Sunken Gardens Pavilion. The Paving the Path program allows donors to buy an inscribed brick that will be installed as part of the brick walkways. The brick measures 5.5 by 8 inches and costs 250 dollars. As of 2024, there were almost 1,000 One Flower Forever honorees and over 1,200 Paving the Path honorees. (Note: Exact numbers: 947 One Flower Forever honorees, 1,269 Paving the Path honorees.)

== Volunteer opportunities ==
There are two yearly volunteer events at Sunken Gardens: "Wake Up the Beds" and "Put the Beds to Bed". The Wake Up the Beds event occurs in early to mid-May and focuses on preparing the beds for the new season and planting the flowers. The Put the Beds to Bed event occurs in early November and focuses on cleaning up the beds and getting ready for the winter.

== Annual themes ==
Since 2005, Sunken Gardens has had annual themes for the plants of the garden. The very first theme was "Beautiful Butterfly", and the most recent theme, as of 2026, was "A Patchwork Garden."

Sunken Gardens annual themes
2005	2006	2007	2008	2009	2010	2011	2012	2013	2014	2015
"Beautiful Butterfly"	"Starry Night"	"Purple Haze"	"Solar Flare"	"Hachimaki", Lucky Charms	"Power of the Peacock"	"Over the Rainbow"	"Mother Nature's Sun"	"Directions – Only Up"	"The Spirit of The Thunderbird"	"2015: A Space Odyssey"
2016	2017	2018	2019	2020	2021	2022	2023	2024	2025	2026
"All things Seuss"	"Purple Reign"	"Sun Salutations"	"Moon River"	"50 Shades of Pink"	"Ruby Slippers"	"A Wonderland"	"Magical Mystery Tour"	"Golden Hours"	"Enchanted Ocean"	"A Patchwork Garden"
