= Fountain Spring, West Virginia =

Unincorporated community in West Virginia, United States

Fountain Spring
- Unincorporated community
- Location within the state of West Virginia Fountain Spring (the United States)
- Coordinates: 39°8′46″N 81°32′41″W
- Country: United States
- State: West Virginia
- County: Wood
- Elevation: 623 ft (190 m)
- Time zone: UTC-5 (Eastern (EST))
  - Summer (DST): UTC-4 (EDT)
- GNIS feature ID: 1560394

Fountain Spring is an unincorporated community located in Wood County, West Virginia, United States.
