= Saline Wetlands Conservation Partnership =

Conservation program

Saline Wetlands Conservation Partnership (SWCP) is a conservation program devoted to the protection and preservation of Nebraska’s Eastern Saline Wetlands. Limited to the floodplain swales and depressions within the Salt Creek, Little Salt Creek, and Rock Creek drainages, it is estimated that the Eastern Saline Wetlands once covered an area in excess of 200,000 acres (810 km^{2}). Recently, due to extensive degradation, draining and filling through commercial, residential, and agricultural development, less than 4,000 acres (16 km^{2}) remain, and many of these remnants are highly degraded. It is becoming increasingly important to preserve this unique wetland resource. Although several existing programs have been recognized to address saline wetland conservation needs, they alone have not been enough to ensure the long term protection of this endangered resource. The Saline Wetland Conservation Partnership (SWCP) was created to offer additional protection and management of the state’s diminishing saline wetlands.

== History ==
The SWCP is unique in its approach to preserve the integrity of Nebraska’s Eastern Saline Wetlands by taking a partnership approach to address the conservation of saline wetlands and the needs of the community. Since 2002, the City of Lincoln has received three Nebraska Environmental Trust (NET) grants and other state and federal funding programs for the implementation of the Eastern Saline Wetlands Project to meet the further conservation needs of Nebraska’s Eastern Saline Wetlands. The City of Lincoln, Lancaster County, Lower Platte South Natural Resource District (LPSNRD), The Nature Conservancy, and the Nebraska Game and Parks Commission (NGPC) are the full-share partners, which established the Saline Wetlands Conservation Partnership in 2003. An implementation plan was developed in 2003 and is the primary responsibility of the SWCP’s full-share partners. To ensure the success of the plan, full-share partners are often required to work closely with other partners and private land owners. Other partners have contributed to the SWCP through their support of Nebraska Environmental Trust grants awarded to the Partnership and/or through providing resources for the conservation and restoration of the Eastern Saline Wetlands.

== Implementation Plan for the Conservation of Nebraska’s Eastern Saline Wetlands ==
The Implementation Plan for the Conservation of Nebraska’s Eastern Saline Wetlands is a holistic watershed approach designed to preserve both wetlands and their surrounding watersheds, and its implementation involves local, state, and federal agencies working in concert with private individuals and organizations to develop additional strategies and programs that encourage saline wetland conservation. The Plan includes Comprehensive Strategies and five Landscape Objectives. The Comprehensive Strategies are not specific to any one property, but are broader in scope and are necessary for the overall successful conservation of saline wetlands and the landscape objectives establish projection and restoration targets for the conservation of about 4,000 acres (16 km^{2}) of saline wetlands.

== Categories of saline wetlands ==
In the Resource Categorization of Nebraska’s Eastern Saline Wetlands, wetlands are categorized into one of four groups:

- Category 1 – Site currently provides saline wetland functions of high value or has the potential to provide high values following restoration or enhancement measures.
- Category 2 – Given current land use and degree of degradation, site currently provides limited saline wetland functions and low values. Restoration potential is low. These sites are so degraded that they are not considered as restorable in the Landscape Objectives section. If, in the future, a Category 2 wetland is determined to be restorable, then the restoration will be considered as contributing to Landscape Objective 4.
- Category 3 – Site is functioning as a freshwater wetland having freshwater plant communities on a saline soil. Currently provides freshwater wetland values and no feasible restoration measures exist to re-establish the historic salt source and saline plant associations.
- Category 4 – Site is functioning as a freshwater wetland having freshwater plant communities on a non-saline hydric soil.

== Land acquisition ==
The partnership acquires property containing saline wetlands from willing sellers, which includes fee-title acquisition, which keep the land in private ownership but protect it in perpetuity. Since 2003, members of the partnership have acquired approximately 717 acres (2.90 km^{2}) of land containing saline wetlands through fee-title acquisition, and approximately 630 acres (2.5 km^{2}) containing saline wetlands through conservation easements.

It is recognized that many of the saline wetlands are on private lands and have been sustained by private landowners voluntarily. The Partnership is willing to work with these land owners by providing a number of programs that will continue to support these sustainable use efforts. Private land programs provide both technical and financial assistance to land owners for the implementation and use of conservation practices.

== Wetland sites under SWCP management ==
The Partnership is currently responsible for the management of over 2,600 acres (11 km^{2}) of saline wetlands and associated conservation zones from various sites in Lancaster and Saunders Counties. Several of the sites are accessible to the public for recreational uses.

== Educational outreach ==
Since its inception, the SWCP has initiated several educational activities to involve and inform the communities in and around Lincoln, NE about the unique saline wetlands and what’s being done to protect the rare resource. The Partnership established an annual program with the Environmental Studies class of one Lincoln, NE public high school on saline wetlands in 2005. Field trips to some of the saline wetland sites are held annually for these students. These field trips include presentations to the students by personnel of the LPSNRD, NGPC, and the University of Nebraska-Lincoln. Topics covered regarding the saline wetlands include vegetation, hydrology, entomology, restoration and mitigation, management, well monitoring and sampling, wildlife, and the relationship of urbanized development with natural areas.

The Partnership also holds educational presentations for elementary students attending several local schools. Each year, information on the saline wetlands is presented to students attending the Earth Wellness Festival and various elementary school nature nights, and sponsors elementary school field trips to saline wetland locations.

The unique dynamics of the saline wetlands also provide for research opportunities at higher levels of education. University involvement on hydrological and entomological research is aided by students and professors at the University of Nebraska-Lincoln. Ongoing research is critical for the understanding of ecological relations within, and the environmental services provided by, the saline wetlands.
