= John J. Lowe =

- Education: University of Nebraska Medical Center; University of Nebraska–Lincoln
- Scientific career
- Workplaces: University of Nebraska Medical Center

John J. Lowe is an American infectious disease scientist, assistant vice chancellor for health security and director of the Global Center for Health Security at the University of Nebraska Medical Center. He is professor and chair in the Department of Environmental, Agricultural and Occupational Health at University of Nebraska Medical Center College of Public Health. In 2014, he led Nebraska Medicine hospital's effort to treat and care for Ebola virus disease patients and led the University of Nebraska Medical Center's coronavirus disease 2019 response efforts.

== Education ==
Lowe received his Bachelor of Science degree in biological chemistry in 2006 and received his Master of Science degree in molecular virology in 2009 from the from University of Nebraska–Lincoln. He then received his Doctor of Philosophy in medical sciences from the University of Nebraska Medical Center in 2012.

== Career ==
Lowe became an assistant professor at University of Nebraska Medical Center College of Public Health in 2013 and was promoted to associate professor in 2016. He became director of research for the Nebraska Biocontainment Unit at Nebraska Medicine in 2011. He became the assistant vice chancellor for health security training and education at University of Nebraska Medical Center in 2017. His research interests include decontamination and infection prevention and control of emerging infectious diseases and special pathogens, including COVID-19, Ebola, Lassa fever and Influenza. Lowe is a co-PI for the National Emerging special pathogen Training and Education Center, a federally funded collaborative between University of Nebraska Medical Center, Emory University, and New York Health and Hospital-Bellevue that is working to address gaps in outbreak preparedness. He became the co-PI for establishing and maintaining the U.S. National Quarantine Unit at the University of Nebraska Medical Center in 2016.

=== Ebola response ===
Lowe coordinated transport and infection control for Ebola virus disease cared for at the University of Nebraska Medical Center. University of Nebraska Medical Center received the first patient with Ebola virus disease, a missionary and physician named Rick Sacra. On September 4, a Massachusetts physician, Rick Sacra, was airlifted from Liberia to be treated in Omaha, Nebraska at the Nebraska Medical Center. Working for Serving In Mission (SIM), he was the third U.S. missionary to contract Ebola. He thought that he probably contracted Ebola while performing a Caesarean section on a patient who had not been diagnosed with the disease. While in hospital, Sacra received a blood transfusion from Brantly, who had recently recovered from the disease. On September 25, Sacra was declared Ebola-free and released from the hospital.

On October 2, 2014, NBC News photojournalist Ashoka Mukpo, covering the outbreak in Liberia, tested positive for Ebola after showing symptoms. Four other members of the NBC team, including physician Nancy Snyderman, were being closely monitored for symptoms. Mukpo was evacuated on October 6 to the University of Nebraska Medical Center for treatment in their isolation unit. On October 21, 2014, Mukpo was declared Ebola-free and allowed to return to his home in Rhode Island.

A government official in Sierra Leone announced on November 13, 2014, that a doctor from Sierra Leone, a permanent resident of the United States married to a U.S. citizen, would be transported to the Nebraska Medical Center for treatment for Ebola. Salia arrived at Eppley Airfield in Omaha on November 15, and was transported to the Nebraska Medical Center. On November 17, Salia died from the disease. Salia had been working as a general surgeon in Freetown, Sierra Leone when he fell ill.

=== COVID-19 response ===
Lowe coordinated transport and oversaw infection control for repatriated individuals quarantined or isolated for SARS-CoV-2 at the University of Nebraska Medicine. February 7, 2020, UNMC and Nebraska Medicine were enlisted to support a federal operation that evacuated 57 Americans from Wuhan, China, during an epidemic of novel coronavirus, SARS CoV-2. The group were placed in quarantine at Camp Ashland, a Nebraska National Guard facility near Omaha.

On February 17, 2020, thirteen Americans were repatriated to the University of Nebraska Medical Center from the Diamond Princess off the coast of Japan. Ten had tested positive, and three others had been exposed. Three days later, eleven of these people tested positive.

Lowe led a team of scientists in March 2020 to collect evidence in the National Quarantine Center, at the University of Nebraska Medical Center, that found the SARS-CoV-2 virus spreads through airborne transmission. This work was the basis for an April 1, 2020, letter from the National Academy of Science Committee on Emerging Infectious Diseases and 21st Century Health Threats to the Office of Science and Technology Policy in the Executive Office of the President raising the possibility of aerosol spread of SARS-CoV-2.

Lowe developed a safe and effective method to decontaminate N95 respirators using ultraviolet light. The process, shared with hospital systems across the U.S., allowed multiple reuse of N95s when personal protective equipment was in short supply.

== Selected publications ==
- Santarpia, J.L., Rivera, D.N., Herrera, V.L., Morwitzer, M.J., Creager, H.M., Santarpia, G.W., Crown, K.K., Brett-Major, D.M., Schnaubelt, E.R., Broadhurst, M.J. and Lawler, J.V., Lowe, J.J., 2020. Aerosol and surface contamination of SARS-CoV-2 observed in quarantine and isolation care. Scientific reports, 10(1), pp. 1–8.
- Lowe, J.J., Jelden, K.C., Schenarts, P.J., Rupp, L.E., Hawes, K.J., Tysor, B.M., Swansiger, R.G., Schwedhelm, S.S., Smith, P.W. and Gibbs, S.G., 2015. Considerations for safe EMS transport of patients infected with Ebola virus. Prehospital Emergency Care, 19(2), pp. 179–183.
- Jelden, K.C., Gibbs, S.G., Smith, P.W., Schwedhelm, M.M., Iwen, P.C., Beam, E.L., Hayes, A.K., Marion, N., Kratochvil, C.J., Boulter, K.C. and Hewlett, A.L., Lowe, J.J., 2015. Nebraska Biocontainment Unit patient discharge and environmental decontamination after Ebola care. American Journal of Infection Control, 43(3), pp. 203–205.
