= COVID-19 pandemic in Nebraska =

Pandemic in Nebraska, United States

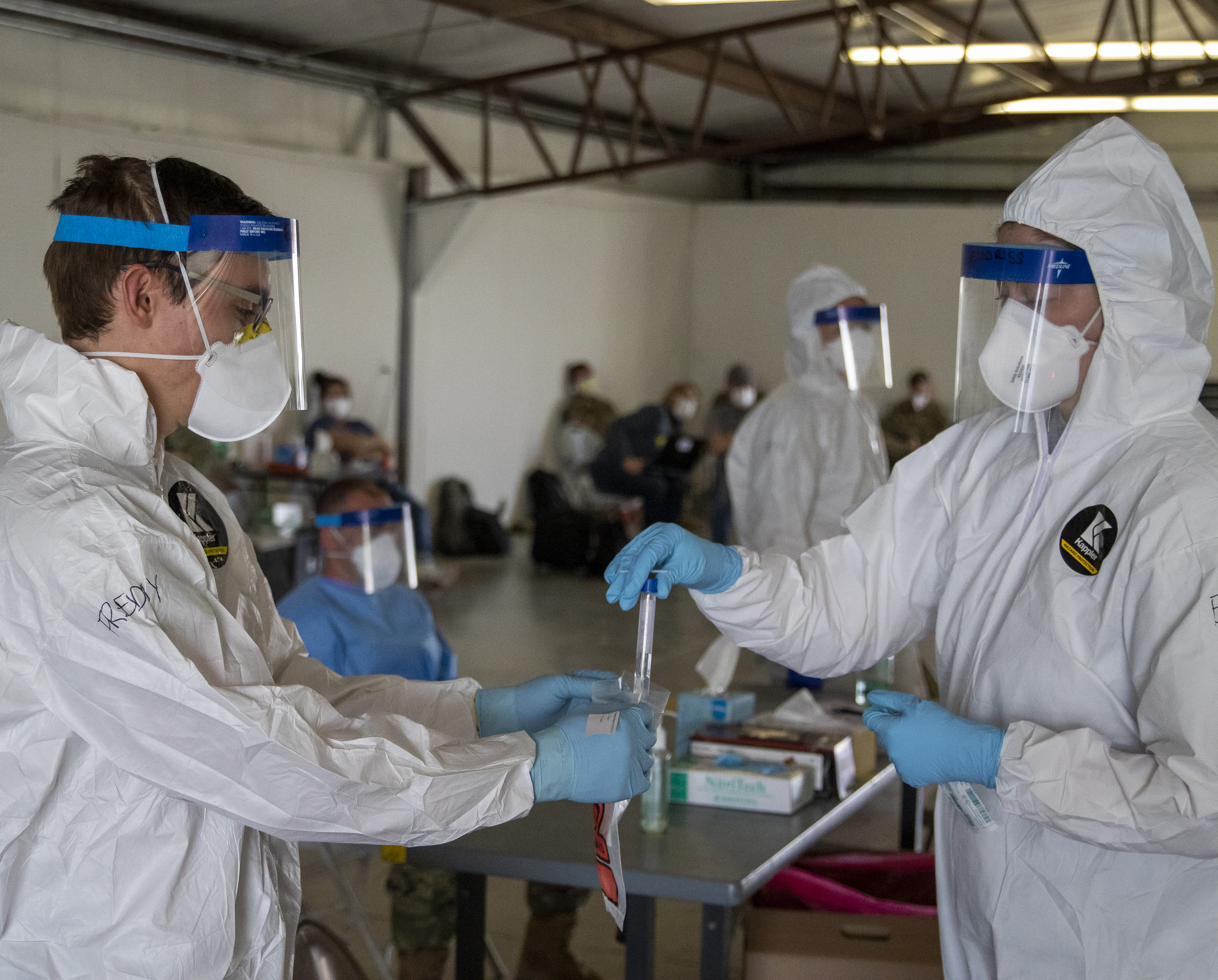
- Collecting COVID-19 test samples at the Sarpy County Fairgrounds in Springfield
- Disease: COVID-19
- Pathogen: SARS-CoV-2
- Location: Nebraska, U.S.
- First outbreak: Wuhan, China
- Index case: Omaha
- Arrival date: March 6, 2020
- Confirmed cases: 475,690
- Hospitalized cases: 6,411
- Recovered: 166,944
- Deaths: 3,986

Government website
- Nebraska Department of Health & Human Services

The COVID-19 pandemic in Nebraska is an ongoing viral pandemic of coronavirus disease 2019 (COVID-19), a novel infectious disease caused by severe acute respiratory syndrome coronavirus 2 (SARS-CoV-2). As of March 2, 2022, there have been 475,690 confirmed cases and 3,986 deaths.

As of May 28, 2021, Nebraska has administered 1,678,709 COVID-19 vaccine doses, and has fully vaccinated 745,974 people, equivalent to 38.96 percent of the population.

== Timeline ==
COVID-19 pandemic medical cases in Nebraska by county
| County (Note: County where individuals with a positive case reside. Location of diagnosis and treatment may vary.) | Cases (Note: Reported confirmed cases. Actual case numbers are probably higher. Reinfections are counted as additional cases.) (Note: Includes 3,705 cases from unknown counties.) | Hospitalized | Deaths (Note: Includes 14 deaths from unknown counties.) | Vaccine (Note: Includes 75,159 nonresidents or persons from unknown counties.) | Population (Note: July 2019 population estimate from "U.S. Census Bureau Quick Facts: Nebraska". United States Census Bureau.) | Cases / 100k |
|---|---|---|---|---|---|---|
| 93 / 93 | 477,761 | 9,056 | 3,410 | 1,205,794 | 1,934,408 | 24,698.0 |
| Adams | 6,498 | 166 | 72 | 15,816 | 31,363 | 20,718.7 |
| Antelope | 1,075 | 38 | 14 | 2,679 | 6,298 | 17,068.9 |
| Arthur | 32 | 3 | 1 | 120 | 463 | 6,911.4 |
| Banner | 89 | 5 | 2 | 350 | 745 | 11,946.3 |
| Blaine | 67 | 1 | 3 | 156 | 465 | 14,408.6 |
| Boone | 1,091 | 31 | 4 | 2,757 | 5,192 | 21,013.1 |
| Box Butte | 2,336 | 91 | 17 | 4,509 | 10,783 | 21,663.7 |
| Boyd | 405 | 20 | 7 | 752 | 1,919 | 21,104.7 |
| Brown | 507 | 6 | 4 | 1,063 | 2,955 | 17,157.4 |
| Buffalo | 11,998 | 272 | 98 | 25,856 | 49,659 | 24,160.8 |
| Burt | 1,343 | 31 | 16 | 3,805 | 6,459 | 20,792.7 |
| Butler | 1,905 | 52 | 18 | 4,173 | 8,016 | 23,765.0 |
| Cass | 6,125 | 69 | 36 | 15,511 | 26,248 | 23,335.1 |
| Cedar | 1,506 | 36 | 15 | 3,647 | 8,402 | 17,924.3 |
| Chase | 743 | 33 | 6 | 1,592 | 3,924 | 18,934.8 |
| Cherry | 537 | 22 | 9 | 1,506 | 5,689 | 9,439.3 |
| Cheyenne | 2,026 | 71 | 24 | 3,683 | 8,910 | 22,738.5 |
| Clay | 1,514 | 39 | 24 | 2,866 | 6,203 | 24,407.5 |
| Colfax | 2,733 | 75 | 27 | 5,135 | 10,709 | 25,520.6 |
| Cuming | 1,807 | 48 | 15 | 5,592 | 8,846 | 20,427.3 |
| Custer | 2,030 | 79 | 30 | 4,103 | 10,777 | 18,836.4 |
| Dakota | 6,900 | 187 | 68 | 9,931 | 20,026 | 34,455.2 |
| Dawes | 1,361 | 54 | 11 | 3,830 | 8,589 | 15,845.8 |
| Dawson | 5,264 | 188 | 44 | 13,001 | 23,595 | 22,309.8 |
| Deuel | 323 | 7 | 2 | 587 | 1,794 | 18,004.5 |
| Dixon | 1,180 | 28 | 10 | 2,455 | 5,636 | 20,936.8 |
| Dodge | 10,104 | 212 | 106 | 21,950 | 36,565 | 27,633.0 |
| Douglas | 149,466 | 2,183 | 1,028 | 374,759 | 571,327 | 26,161.2 |
| Dundy | 349 | 26 | 6 | 618 | 1,693 | 20,614.3 |
| Fillmore | 1,126 | 21 | 12 | 3,083 | 5,462 | 20,615.2 |
| Franklin | 421 | 19 | 11 | 1,455 | 2,979 | 14,132.3 |
| Frontier | 542 | 13 | 2 | 980 | 2,627 | 20,631.9 |
| Furnas | 1,121 | 27 | 7 | 2,391 | 4,676 | 23,973.5 |
| Gage | 3,588 | 119 | 44 | 11,421 | 21,513 | 16,678.3 |
| Garden | 368 | 8 | 0 | 817 | 1,837 | 20,032.7 |
| Garfield | 397 | 8 | 2 | 790 | 1,969 | 20,162.5 |
| Gosper | 372 | 20 | 6 | 991 | 1,990 | 18,693.5 |
| Grant | 106 | 7 | 5 | 183 | 623 | 17,014.4 |
| Greeley | 410 | 16 | 2 | 1,047 | 2,356 | 17,402.4 |
| Hall | 16,516 | 418 | 138 | 33,051 | 61,353 | 26,919.6 |
| Hamilton | 2,249 | 41 | 25 | 4,977 | 9,324 | 24,120.5 |
| Harlan | 378 | 11 | 2 | 1,436 | 3,380 | 11,183.4 |
| Hayes | 105 | 8 | 0 | 274 | 922 | 11,388.3 |
| Hitchcock | 531 | 27 | 7 | 1,009 | 2,762 | 19,225.2 |
| Holt | 2,150 | 53 | 20 | 4,894 | 10,067 | 21,356.9 |
| Hooker | 112 | 9 | 5 | 322 | 682 | 16,422.3 |
| Howard | 1,186 | 32 | 15 | 2,976 | 6,445 | 18,401.9 |
| Jefferson | 1,209 | 10 | 7 | 4,014 | 7,046 | 17,158.7 |
| Johnson | 868 | 40 | 9 | 2,826 | 5,071 | 17,116.9 |
| Kearney | 1,182 | 26 | 9 | 3,340 | 6,495 | 18,198.6 |
| Keith | 1,539 | 59 | 19 | 3,663 | 8,034 | 19,156.1 |
| Keya Paha | 119 | 2 | 0 | 240 | 806 | 14,764.3 |
| Kimball | 769 | 10 | 4 | 1,337 | 3,632 | 21,172.9 |
| Knox | 1,677 | 46 | 12 | 3,684 | 8,332 | 20,127.2 |
| Lancaster | 78,114 | 797 | 287 | 210,944 | 319,090 | 24,480.2 |
| Lincoln | 8,715 | 315 | 108 | 15,287 | 34,914 | 24,961.3 |
| Logan | 148 | 5 | 0 | 171 | 748 | 19,786.1 |
| Loup | 87 | 1 | 0 | 252 | 664 | 13,102.4 |
| Madison | 9,682 | 458 | 67 | 18,053 | 35,099 | 27,584.8 |
| McPherson | 74 | 2 | 1 | 88 | 494 | 14,979.8 |
| Merrick | 1,701 | 35 | 17 | 3,656 | 7,755 | 21,934.2 |
| Morrill | 1,242 | 53 | 20 | 1,656 | 4,642 | 26,755.7 |
| Nance | 800 | 24 | 12 | 1,384 | 3,519 | 22,733.7 |
| Nemaha | 1,486 | 13 | 20 | 3,639 | 6,972 | 21,313.8 |
| Nuckolls | 977 | 34 | 13 | 2,080 | 4,148 | 23,553.5 |
| Otoe | 3,345 | 27 | 18 | 9,701 | 16,012 | 20,890.6 |
| Pawnee | 412 | 4 | 2 | 1,074 | 2,613 | 15,767.3 |
| Perkins | 530 | 22 | 12 | 1,186 | 2,891 | 18,332.8 |
| Phelps | 2,326 | 44 | 14 | 4,317 | 9,034 | 25,747.2 |
| Pierce | 1,273 | 47 | 21 | 2,826 | 7,148 | 17,809.2 |
| Platte | 8,653 | 253 | 74 | 18,159 | 33,470 | 25,853.0 |
| Polk | 1,219 | 37 | 12 | 2,499 | 5,213 | 23,383.8 |
| Red Willow | 2,328 | 103 | 19 | 4,697 | 10,724 | 21,708.3 |
| Richardson | 1,807 | 21 | 23 | 3,705 | 7,865 | 22,975.2 |
| Rock | 172 | 5 | 2 | 665 | 1,357 | 12,675.0 |
| Saline | 3,796 | 45 | 12 | 8,271 | 14,224 | 26,687.3 |
| Sarpy | 49,709 | 483 | 247 | 115,803 | 187,196 | 26,554.5 |
| Saunders | 5,023 | 82 | 29 | 12,038 | 21,578 | 23,278.3 |
| Scotts Bluff | 9,439 | 418 | 83 | 16,844 | 35,618 | 26,500.6 |
| Seward | 3,372 | 130 | 39 | 9,400 | 17,284 | 19,509.4 |
| Sheridan | 1,000 | 47 | 22 | 1,738 | 5,246 | 19,062.1 |
| Sherman | 586 | 19 | 4 | 1,346 | 3,001 | 19,526.8 |
| Sioux | 65 | 3 | 1 | 311 | 1,166 | 5,574.6 |
| Stanton | 745 | 43 | 11 | 2,086 | 5,920 | 12,584.5 |
| Thayer | 1,110 | 14 | 8 | 2,522 | 5,003 | 22,186.7 |
| Thomas | 96 | 6 | 1 | 193 | 722 | 13,296.4 |
| Thurston | 1,781 | 49 | 23 | 2,396 | 7,224 | 24,653.9 |
| Valley | 753 | 20 | 6 | 1,743 | 4,158 | 18,109.7 |
| Washington | 4,546 | 103 | 42 | 11,961 | 20,729 | 21,930.6 |
| Wayne | 1,826 | 36 | 11 | 4,511 | 9,385 | 19,456.6 |
| Webster | 712 | 18 | 10 | 1,568 | 3,487 | 20,418.7 |
| Wheeler | 127 | 5 | 2 | 273 | 783 | 16,219.7 |
| York | 3,924 | 112 | 23 | 7,589 | 13,679 | 28,686.3 |
Final update March 31, 2022, with data through the previous day Data is publicly reported by Nebraska Department of Health and Human Services

=== 2020 ===
==== February ====
February 7, 2020, 57 Americans were evacuated from Wuhan, China to Nebraska. University of Nebraska Medical Center and Nebraska Medicine supported the federal quarantine operation at Camp Ashland, a Nebraska National Guard facility near Omaha. On February 17, thirteen Americans were repatriated to University of Nebraska Medical Center from the Diamond Princess off the coast of Japan. Ten had tested positive, and three others had been exposed. Three days later, eleven of these people tested positive.

==== March ====
On March 6, Governor Pete Ricketts announced Nebraska's first presumptive case, a 36-year-old woman from Omaha who had recently returned from a trip to England. On March 19, Ricketts began to institute restrictions on commerce and public gatherings via the "Directed Health Measures" (DHM) system, within individual counties based on the number of active infections in a region. Nebraska's first two deaths were announced on March 27; the state had reached 83 confirmed cases. A third death was announced on March 30, followed by a fourth the next day.

==== April ====
A fifth death was confirmed on April 1. followed by another on April 2 (also the first case in Gage County). Two new deaths were confirmed on April 4, both in Douglas County; the state's total number of cases was 321. On April 7, four new deaths were announced, with two in Douglas County, and one each from Custer and Hall counties. By April 9, the state had reached 577 cases and 15 deaths. By April 17, the number of statewide cases had surpassed 1000. In mid-April, a notable spike in cases attributed to meat packing plants began to emerge; by April 21, 237 cases had been attributed to a JBS facility in Grand Island alone, accounting for roughly 40% of all cases in the Central District Health Department region. By April 28, Nebraska had reached 3,374 cases in total.

==== May ====
On May 5, Governor Ricketts announced that the state would not publish data on the number of cases from meat processing plants "on a specific company by company basis." By May 8, there were 6,771 cases in Nebraska, with Governor Ricketts estimating that approximately one sixth of them were tied to meat packing facilities.

By late-May, cases had begun to increase among staff of the Nebraska State Penitentiary. Hospital capacity had become stable in Lincoln.

==== June ====
Ali Khan, Dean of the University of Nebraska Medical Center College of Public Health, stated that transmission of COVID-19 in Nebraska was still "relatively uncontrolled",

On June 24, it was reported that Nebraska had the fourth-lowest COVID-19 fatality rate of all U.S. states, behind only Arkansas, South Dakota, and Utah.

==== July ====
Amidst major increases in other parts of the country, it was reported that new cases in Nebraska were "about as stable as we've ever been", and active hospitalizations at their lowest point since mid-April. Ricketts and other government officials encouraged residents to continue following government guidelines and health measures over the Independence Day weekend to prevent the spikes that had been seen elsewhere.

On July 10, Ricketts reported that cases continued to remain steady and that hospitalizations were down.

==== August ====
On August 20, seven cases in the Panhandle were traced to exposures at the Sturgis Motorcycle Rally.

==== September ====
A spike in cases was reported in Douglas County, especially among younger residents, with officials suggesting that Labor Day weekend activities may have led to them.

In September 2020, the state saw its largest 14-day increase in cases since May. Test positivity rates have remained lower than they were at the onset of the pandemic, although the availability of testing had also been expanded since.

==== October ====
On October 4, the state passed 500 cumulative deaths attributed to coronavirus. 54 percent have attributed to individuals in the 75-85+ age group.

=== 2021 ===
==== February ====
The city council of Omaha convened to debate a proposal to extend the mask mandate from February 23 until May 25. Protesters opposing the mandate met outside city hall and attended the meeting without masks.

=== July ===
On June 28, Governor Ricketts issued an executive over which declared that Nebraska's emergency declaration would expire at 11:59 p.m. on June 30, and that almost all remaining COVID-19-related orders would expire July 30. Due to HIPAA and state medical privacy laws that were overridden by the state of emergency, the Nebraska Department of Health and Human Services (DHSS) shut down its online dashboard, ceased the publication of new data, and refused requests from the media for data. Local governments could still publish COVID-19-related data, as they were not considered a covered entity under HIPAA. The TestNebraska program was also phased out.

On July 14, amid criticism of the decision with the spread of Delta variant, the state announced plans to publish weekly data on a new website.

=== August ===
The expiration of COVID-19 executive orders on July 31 prohibits counties with a population of less than 20,000 from publishing COVID-19 data, as per the safe harbor standards of the HIPAA Privacy Rule.

== Government response ==
=== Health care ===
On March 27, Governor Ricketts announced that the state would waive certain license fees and background checks in order to expedite the entry of retired, inactive, and out-of-state health professionals to help in managing the pandemic.

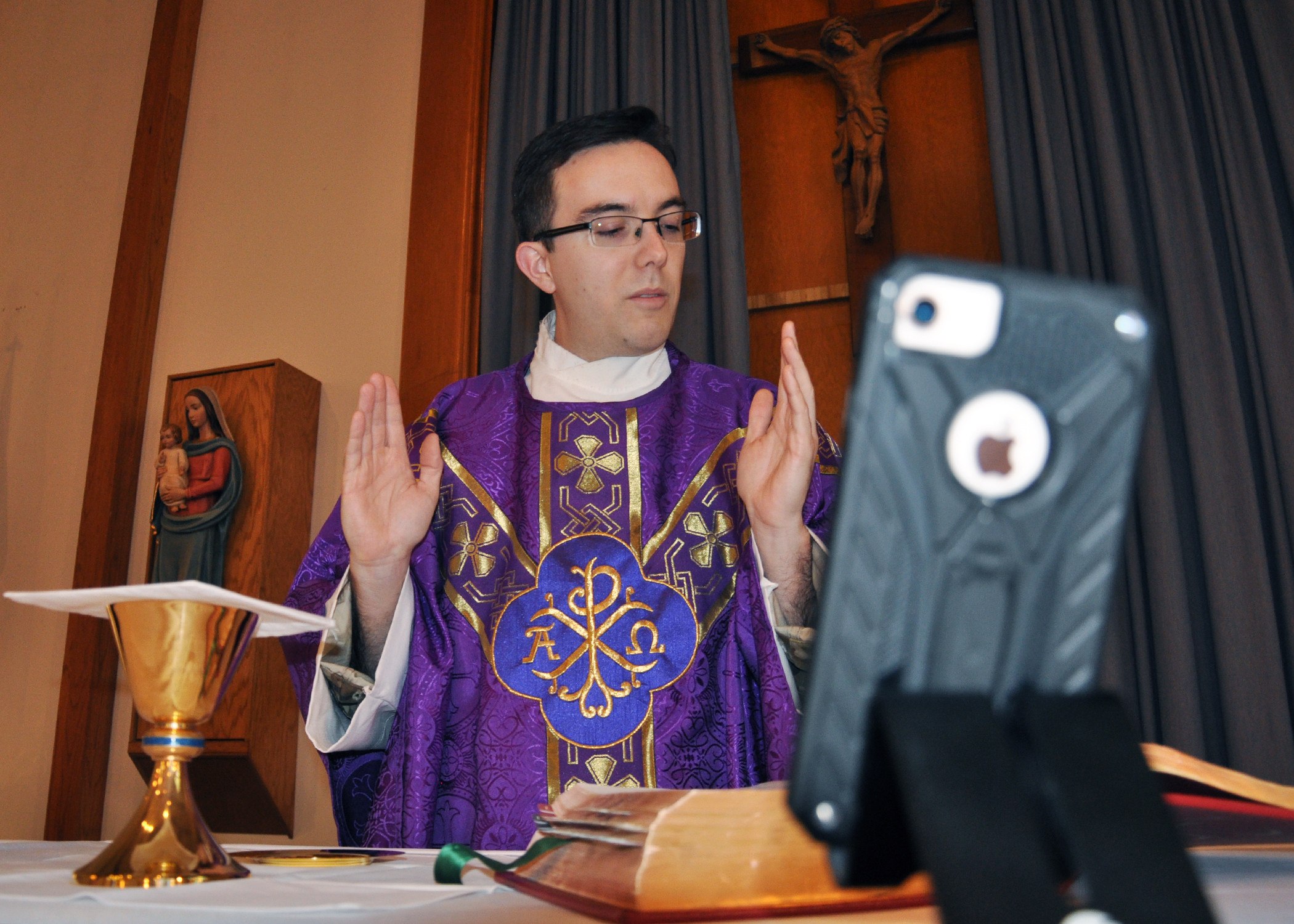
Offutt Air Force Base chaplain conducting virtual mass

On April 21, Ricketts announced a program known as TestNebraska to expand testing via partnerships with private companies, with a goal to reach 3,000 tests per-day within the next five weeks. The $27 million program was modeled upon a similar program in Utah, and involves companies based in the area such as Domo, Nomi Health, Qualtrics, and SafeLine Health. Iowa had also signed a contract with the same companies for a similar program.

The rollout of the program faced criticism; on May 11, Democratic state senators Machaela Cavanaugh, Carol Blood, Megan Hunt, and Rick Kolowski called for Nebraska to cancel its contracts with the firms, questioning Nomi's expertise in the field, and arguing that Nebraska should have made investments in local companies to run the testing program. Ricketts defended the TestNebraska program, stating that "they should be happy that we're doing the tests", and that "the senators just don't understand what this all involves to pull together something like this so quickly."

In regards to accusations over a disparity in the number of positive results generated from TestNebraska, Ricketts noted that the program was initially focusing on testing healthcare workers and those with fewer or no symptoms; that past Friday, the program was expanded add workers in the meat packing industry and seniors over 65 as priorities. The program initially stated that results would be returned in 48 hours; however, after missing this target due to various factors (such as some of the required equipment arriving late), the window was extended to 72.

An editorial in the Grand Island Independent stated that the addresses of those tested were not being supplied to the local health department. When asked about the editorial on May 13, Ricketts explained that they had begun doing so on May 12, and added that "we rushed [TestNebraska] to get this out as quickly as possible. We certainly could have spent a month or two testing it. But we thought the better deal here was to make sure we got it out testing, even if it wasn't a perfect solution, we weren't going to let the perfect be the enemy of the good here."

In early-July 2020, some testing sites began to experience shortages in lab supplies due to increased demand in other states with spikes. These have led to delays in the processing of results, and in some cases, temporary closures of testing sites.

=== Directed health measures ===
Rather than implement a state-wide stay-at-home order, Nebraska employed a framework of "Directed Health Measures" (DHM), which included enforceable restrictions on public gatherings of more than 10 people, elective medical procedures, restaurants (restricted to take-out service only), schools (must close to students through May 31, no extracurricular activities), and social distancing. These measures were phased in on a county-by-county basis based on active infections among the regions.

- March 19: Cass, Douglas, and Sarpy counties. (through May 3)
- March 25: Dodge, Lancaster, Saunders, and Washington counties. (through May 6)
- March 28: Butler, Hall, Hamilton, Merrick, Polk, Seward, and York counties. (through May 6)
- March 29: Burt, Cuming, Madison, and Stanton counties. (through May 6)
- March 30: Banner, Box Butte, Cheyenne, Dawes, Deuel, Garden, Grant, Kimball, Morrill, Scotts Bluff, Sheridan, and Sioux counties. (through May 11)
- March 31: Adams, Buffalo, Clay, Dawson, Franklin, Gosper, Harlan, Kearney, Nuckolls, Phelps, and Webster counties. (through May 11)
- April 1: Antelope, Arthur, Boyd, Brown, Cherry, Holt, Hooker, Keya Paha, Knox, Lincoln, Logan, McPherson, Pierce, Rock, and Thomas counties. (through May 11)
- April 3: All other counties not already under a DHM.

Ricketts stated on April 2 that their goal was to avoid imposing a full stay-at-home order like other states, arguing that Nebraska's rules were stricter than those of some areas that had actually imposed stay-at-home orders. On April 3, all other counties not yet under a Directed Health Measure became subject to one through May 11.

On April 9, Governor Ricketts announced guidance known as "21 Days to Stay Home and Stay Healthy in Nebraska", including recommendations for residents to avoid non-essential errands and travel, and to respect other restrictions prescribed by the DHMs.

As part of the guidance, a new state-wide DHM ordered the closure of all personal care services (such as salons and tattoo parlors), gentleman's clubs, bottle clubs, and indoor theaters, through April 30, and suspended all organized team sports through May 31. Auto races were also specifically classified as a type of public gathering. Once again, Ricketts did not impose a legally-enforceable stay-at-home order, stating that it was "about asking Nebraskans to do what's right", and that compliance with the existing guidance had been "really good".

==== DHMs for reopenings ====
On April 24, it was announced that the state-wide DHM would be extended through May 3, and be superseded on May 4 by 19 new DHMs effective through May 31. These new measures would be administered by Nebraska's local health departments, and contain some loosening of prior restrictions. Elective medical procedures would be allowed to resume (with limited capacity at hospitals), and places of worship would be allowed to operate with social distancing between household groups.

In the Douglas County, Sarpy Cass, East Central, Four Corners, Loup Basin, North Central, Northeast Nebraska, Panhandle Public, Southeast District, and Southwest Nebraska health regions, some restrictions were further-relaxed. Restaurants were allowed to offer dine-in service at half capacity (with a maximum of six patrons per-party, no self-service or buffets, and alcohol only served to those with an intent to dine), and personal care facilities could re-open (provided both employees and customers wear face coverings). Bars, cinemas, bottle clubs, and gentleman's clubs remained closed through at least May 31. On May 12, the South Heartland District joined this phase as well.

On June 1, new DHMs were issued, divided into "Phase I" and "Phase II". Phase I applied inside Dakota, Hall, Hamilton, and Merrick counties, and allowed restaurants to offer dine-in service at half capacity, and gyms and personal care facilities to open with a limit of 10 customers at a time. Outside of these counties, Phase II allowed bars and gentleman's clubs to open to half capacity (with no recreational activities), gatherings (including cinemas, entertainment venues, gyms, and other venues) allowed to be held with a maximum of 25 people or half of rated occupancy (whichever is greater), and practice allowed to begin in low-contact sports such as baseball/softball, rodeos, and tennis (with games allowed to begin June 18). Individuals returning from international travel must self-isolate for 14 days on arrival.

Nebraska recommends, but has not mandated the wearing of face masks in public spaces. Governor Ricketts has threatened that the state would withhold CARES Act relief funding from counties that require the wearing of masks at government offices and courthouses, citing that being taxpayers "outweigh[ed] the fact that we recommend that they wear a mask". This stance has faced criticism from local officials, who felt that Ricketts was penalizing compliance with federal guidance. His decision echoes similar stances against mask mandates by President Donald Trump and his supporters.

Lincoln County announced its intent to enshrine recommendations for restaurants (including the wearing of masks by public-facing employees, and cleaning protocols) in law under its DHM.

On June 15, Governor Ricketts announced details for Phase III, which began June 22 for health regions previously in Phase II. Bars and restaurants were allowed to reopen to full capacity (though groups of eight or more must be split among tables, and self-service remains prohibited), and recreational activities can be offered. Patrons must remain seated unless partaking in a recreational activity. Indoor gatherings can be held at a maximum of 50% occupancy, and outdoor gatherings at 75% occupancy, both capped at 10,000, and with social distancing between groups. Fitness and health centers are raised to 75% capacity. Capacity of child care services also increased. Public events such as carnivals and parades remain prohibited. State-wide, elective surgeries also resumed on June 22, and contact sports were allowed to resume play on July 1.

Counties in Phase I entered Phase II at this time. Plans were announced for in-person classes to resume at schools in the fall, subject to guidance to be issued by the Nebraska Department of Education. On June 30, Dakota, Hall, Hamilton and Merrick moved to Phase III, joining the rest of the state.

On July 24, Central Nebraska's Loup Basin health region became the first to enter Phase IV, under which legal enforcement of most of the existing regulations is suspended (being converted to guidance instead), besides those on capacity of indoor gatherings (75%), and social distancing. Events larger than 500 people (1000 in Douglas County) remain subject to the approval of local health authorities, and require submission of a written plan. By September 8, four health regions had entered Phase IV. On September 14, the majority of the state entered Phase IV, excluding Lancaster County (which intends to retain Phase III restrictions for the time being).

=== Municipal responses ===
On April 3, 2020, Mayor of Omaha Jean Stothert threatened to close the city's parks if visitors do not practice social distancing, citing crowding at various local parks over the past weekend.

On July 17, 2020, Lancaster County enacted a mandate for residents to wear face masks when social distancing is not possible, which took effect July 20. Governor Ricketts has challenged local authorities' ability to issue mask mandates, stating that "generally local health departments have to check in with us and so they're not going to be able to make those mandates without us." On July 20, Mayor of Lincoln Leirion Gaylor Baird enacted a local mask mandate. Douglas County attempted to introduce a mask mandate, but backtracked after the Attorney General's office challenged its legality.

On August 11, 2020, Omaha passed a similar ordinance.

=== Vaccination ===
The first shipment of COVID-19 vaccines became available in Nebraska on December 14, 2020. As with other states, Nebraska initially prioritized those at the highest risk, such as health care workers. In January 2021, Governor Ricketts controversially stated that illegal immigrants would not be prioritized in the vaccination program. The announcement provoked criticism, as, despite claims to the contrary by Ricketts, undocumented workers were identified by critics as being frequent employees of food production facilities—a profession considered to be at a high risk for COVID-19 exposure. The state's official vaccination framework made no reference to a person's immigration status as an eligibility factor.

== Other reactions ==
=== Research ===
Amid shortages of personal protective equipment, the University of Nebraska Medical Center conducted experiments in using UV light to disinfect and reuse masks. The university also partnered with students from the University of Nebraska at Omaha to develop a COVID-19 app for self-assessment on iOS, using Apple's CareKit and ResearchKit frameworks.

=== Sports ===
On March 12, the NCAA cancelled all of its remaining tournaments for the academic year. This included the 2020 College World Series baseball tournament, which is hosted by Omaha under a long-term agreement. The cancellation was expected to have a major economic impact, especially on businesses near TD Ameritrade Park (such as bars, restaurants, and shops) that rely on the influx of fans for their revenue. Spring sports at Nebraska's high schools were also cancelled.

In horse racing, Fonner Park in Grand Island suspended races on March 16, before resuming its season behind closed doors beginning March 23 with enhanced safety protocols (initially for a two-week "trial" period), and holding racedays from Monday to Wednesday instead of on weekends. As one of the few U.S. tracks to continue operations, off-track betting simulcasts from Fonner Park would attract national attention to the relatively obscure track: Fonner Park set a record single-day handle of $1.3 million on March 23 (exceeding the previous record of $1.2 million), and the average daily handle reached $2.1 million by the end of the "trial"—prompting the track to continue with this format for the remainder of the season. Fonner Park handled $71.3 million in wagers from February through April 2020, an increase of $63.8 million over 2019.

In August 2020, the Big Ten Conference indefinitely delayed the start of its 2020 college football season. The Nebraska Cornhuskers football team declared an intent to play in the fall as an independent, but the Big Ten's commissioner stated that they could not do so without consequences. A group of players also attempted to sue the conference, disputing whether its council properly voted on the delay. In mid-September, the Big Ten approved a shortened season beginning in late-October, with all games held behind closed doors.

== Statistics ==
=== Hospitalizations ===
Source: Nebraska Department of Health and Human Services

== See also ==
- Timeline of the COVID-19 pandemic in the United States
- COVID-19 pandemic in the United States – for impact on the country
- COVID-19 pandemic – for impact on other countries
