= Rod Markin =

American pathologist

Rodney S. Markin
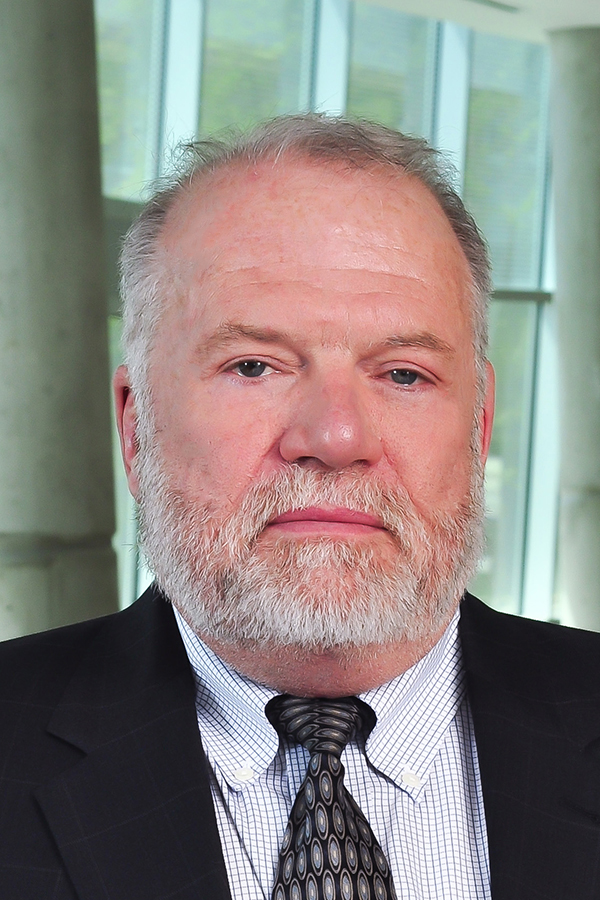
- Dr. Rod Markin
- Born: Rodney Smith Markin; 1956 (age 69–70); Lincoln, Nebraska, U.S.
- Occupations: Pathologist, entrepreneur
- Known for: Laboratory automation

Academic background
- Education: Nebraska Wesleyan University (BS); University of Nebraska–Lincoln (Phd)
- Alma mater: University of Nebraska Medical Center

Rodney Smith Markin (born 1956), is an American pathologist and authority in the field of laboratory automation. In 1993, he designed and created one of the world's first automated clinical laboratory specimen, device and analyzer management systems. In the mid-1990s, he chaired a standards group called the Clinical Testing Automation Standards Steering Committee (CTASSC) of the American Association for Clinical Chemistry, which later evolved into an area committee of the Clinical and Laboratory Standards Institute.

Markin serves as the Vice President for Business Development and practices pathology at Nebraska Medicine, is associate vice chancellor for business development for the University of Nebraska Medical Center, and executive director of the UNeTech Institute of the University of Nebraska Medical Center and the University of Nebraska Omaha. He serves as both the David T. Purtilo Professor in the Department of Pathology and Microbiology in UNMC's College of Medicine as well as the Executive Director of the UNeTech Institute. Prior to his current position, he was the chief operating officier of the University of Nebraska system, the chief technology officer at UNMC, interim dean of the UNMC College of Medicine, board chairman and president and CEO of the Nebraska Medicine clinical practice plan (fka UNMC Physicians), an academic medical practice which includes more than 750 physicians, and has held several other administrative and academic positions at the University of Nebraska Medical Center.

== Early life ==
Markin was born and raised in Lincoln, Nebraska. He received a Bachelor of Science degree in 1977 from Nebraska Wesleyan University, where he majored in chemistry with minors in mathematics and physics. He received a Ph.D. in chemistry from the University of Nebraska–Lincoln in 1980; he earned his medical degree from the University of Nebraska Medical Center (UNMC) in 1983; he completed his residency in pathology and laboratory medicine at UNMC in 1986. He has been on the UNMC faculty since 1986. His professional and academic research interests have focused on clinical laboratory automation including robotics, information systems, medical utilization management, business efficiency modeling, adult and pediatric pathology, liver/gastrointestinal pathology, telehealth, telemedicine, technology development and mobile health.

== Career ==
=== Laboratory automation development ===
Markin's interest in laboratory automation, blending clinical processes with information technology, began during his graduate studies, which focused on graph theory. By 1989, he developed a prototype system that would later allow "plug-and-play" integration of automation systems and clinical analyzers for managing and testing of patient specimens. His approach was to build an automated transport system which would allow various testing processes using commercial, off-the-shelf testing and collection systems. He didn't design the instruments, but sought an automated system to manage the testing processes, leading to increased efficiency, improved reporting and lower laboratory costs.

He founded LAB-InterLink in 1993, and commercialized a system to manage clinical specimens using an automated transportation system and specimen processing devices (i.e. decapping devices, recapping devices, instrument or analyzer interfaces, etc.) for laboratory testing and processing. For example, the specimen would be separated using a centrifuge; the specimen container would be uncapped; the specimen would be tested as ordered by the physician; the container would be recapped; and the specimen would be stored in the event further testing is needed. Test results were provided to the physician or provider as part of the software management system.

LAB-InterLink sold automation systems in North America and internationally, and offices were set up in the United States, Canada and Israel. In 2004, the U.S. company was sold to Cardinal Health and the Canadian company was sold to an investor group. Today the technology of the U.S. company is controlled by Abbott Laboratories (2007) and the Canadian company was acquired by Cerner Corp. (2013)

=== University of Nebraska Medical Center ===
Markin was awarded the Ida Ittner Postdoctoral Fellowship studying lead toxicity in children from 1980 to 1982, working in the laboratory of Dr. Carol R. Angle. In 2005, Markin was named the David T. Purtilo Professor of Pathology and Microbiology. Markin helped develop Children's Specialty Physicians, the pediatric practice plan for the UNMC College of Medicine at Children's Hospital & Medical Center. Markin also holds appointments in the Departments of Surgery and Psychiatry. Markin was inducted into the National Academy of Inventors Fellows Class of 2015. He has also received the Lifetime Achievement Award from UNeMed Corporation, UNMC's technology transfer office, for his innovations that have transformed the clinical laboratory.

Markin leads the telehealth initiative of UNMC and Nebraska Medicine. Since 2011, he has served as associate vice chancellor for business development and as chief technology officer. In October 2005, the U.S. Defense Department provided a grant to Markin and his team to design a new method for microbiology automation. Known as the Microbiology Automation Research Project, or "MARP," the project is designed to develop a broad platform that can be used in the clinical laboratory, including applications for bacteriology, mycology and virology. Additionally, the project has potential uses for other applications, including bioterrorism testing, and holds significant promise for the civilian sector. Markin holds several patents, and has written numerous industry articles on laboratory automation. In 2000, he co-authored an article which provided a history of laboratory automation. He is a member of the editorial boards of several industry publications, including the Journal of the Association for Laboratory Automation (JALA).

== Personal and family ==
Markin lives in Omaha; with his wife, Betsy. He has two children, Nick and Chris, who live in Omaha and Chicago respectively. He also lives with his step-daughter Gracie and step-son Danny. On 9/11, Markin was on a plane in Canada when orders came out to ground all aircraft. The ensuing ordeal was captured in a theatrical production in Omaha.
