= Nebraska Medicine facilities =

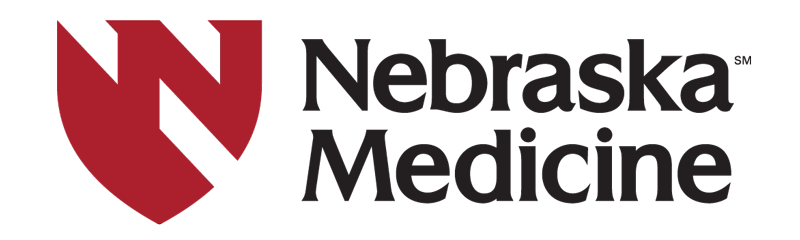
Logo of Nebraska Medicine since 2014

Nebraska Medicine operates two hospitals and 70 specialty and primary care clinics. It also operates five immediate-care clinics in Omaha and surrounding cities: Chalco Health Center; Eagle Run Health Center; Family Medicine at Bellevue Clinic; and Midtown Health Center.

== Nebraska Medical Center ==
Nebraska Medical Center

Geography
- Location: 4350 Dewey Ave., Omaha, Nebraska, U.S.
- Coordinates: 41.256427°N 95.977767°W

Organisation
- Type: Private non-profit
- Affiliated university: University of Nebraska Medical Center

Services
- Emergency department: Level I trauma center
- Beds: 718

Helipads
- Helipad: 61NE
Number	Length		Surface
Number	ft	m	Surface
H1	45	14	Concrete
H2	45	14	Concrete

History
- Founded: 1997

Links
- Website: www.nebraskamed.com/nebraska-medical-center
- Lists: Hospitals in U.S.

Nebraska Medical Center serves as Nebraska Medicine's main campus. Located in Midtown Omaha, it is the largest hospital in Nebraska, with 718 beds, since 2019. It is licensed as an acute-care facility with an emergency department and a number of specialty clinics, and employs physicians in "all major specialties and services". The facility is the primary teaching hospital for Nebraska Medicine's academic partner, University of Nebraska Medical Center and, although they share campuses, they operate independently. A number of buildings on the Nebraska Medical Center campus are operated by UNMC, for example the Eppley Cancer Institute.

Notable Nebraska Medicine-affiliated facilities on the Nebraska Medical Center campus include:

- Fred & Pamela Buffett Cancer Center – Associated with both Nebraska Medicine and UNMC, Nebraska Medicine and UNMC spent $323 million on the center's construction, which opened to the public in June 2017.
- Nebraska Biocontainment Unit – The Nebraska Biocontainment Unit (NBU), in the Nebraska Medical Center, is a collaboration between Nebraska Medicine, UNMC, and the Nebraska Department of Health and Human Services. Commissioned in 2005 by the United States Centers for Disease Control, it was then the largest of the four dedicated biocontainment units in the United States, with a 10-bed isolation unit. Staff in the unit train other healthcare practitioners on handling highly infectious diseases.
- Clarkson College – Affiliated with Nebraska Medicine, Clarkson College is an allied health college on the Nebraska Medical Center campus.
- Hixson-Lied Center for Clinical Excellence – The Nebraska Medical Center broke ground on the project in 2002, opening the $56.5 million facility to the public in 2005. The building covers 165,000 square feet (15,300 m^{2}) over four floors and houses emergency, radiology, cardiology, surgery and the newborn intensive care unit.
- Diabetes Center – The Diabetes Center at Nebraska Medicine combines counseling, education, research, and clinical care in treating diabetes. It opened in 2008.
- Lied Transplant Center – A partnership between UNMC and Nebraska Medicine, Lied Transplant Center was first built in 1999. The building houses a clinic, research labs and inpatient hospital units.
- Lauritzen Outpatient Center – Opened in 2016, it has an ambulatory surgery center, clinics, a pharmacy and a laboratory.

== Bellevue Medical Center ==
Bellevue Medical Center is a general hospital located in Bellevue, Nebraska. The hospital has 91 licensed beds. The hospital was announced in late 2006 and began construction in early 2007. Bellevue Medical Center officially opened in 2010. In 2016, Nebraska Medicine purchased the hospital for $130 million.

== Project Health ==
Project Health Tower is an under-construction high-rise health facility to be built in Midtown Omaha, Nebraska, U.S. The building is being developed by University of Nebraska Medical Center and Nebraska Medicine for use as a training facility and main hospital. The hospital began construction in April 2025 and is estimated to be completed in 2026. Project Health Tower will have 18 to 20 floors and will be an estimated 380 feet (120 m) 400 feet (120 m) tall.

== Village Pointe Health Center ==
Village Pointe Health Center is a specialty health center in West Omaha, Nebraska. A 90,000 square feet (0.0032 sq mi) addition began construction in late 2021 and opened in 2023.

== Gretna Landing Health Center ==
Gretna Landing Health Center is a proposed health center located in Gretna, Nebraska. In 2025, it was announced that Nebraska Medicine, the City of Gretna, and Noddle Companies would be constructing a new development known as Gretna Landing. Gretna Landing Health Center will be the main part of the development, and is estimated to open in 2027.

== Fred & Pamela Buffett Cancer Center – Kearney ==
Fred & Pamela Buffett Cancer Center – Kearney is a cancer center located in Kearney, Nebraska. The center contains 53,000 square feet (4,900 m^{2}) and is intentionally named in line with the cancer center in Midtown Omaha. The hospital was founded out of a partnership with Heartland Hematology and Oncology. Construction began in 2023 and the center opened in December 2024.
