= Point of care =

Moment when clinicians deliver healthcare

Clinical point of care (POC) is the point in time when clinicians deliver healthcare products and services to patients at the time of care.

== Clinical documentation ==
Clinical documentation is a record of the critical thinking and judgment of a health care professional, facilitating consistency and effective communication among clinicians.

Documentation performed at the time of clinical point of care can be conducted using paper or electronic formats. This process aims to capture medical information pertaining to patient's healthcare needs. The patient's health record is a legal document that contains details regarding patient's care and progress. The types of information captured during the clinical point of care documentation include the actions taken by clinical staff including physicians and nurses, and the patient's healthcare needs, goals, diagnosis and the type of care they have received from the healthcare providers.

Such documentations provide evidence regarding safe, effective and ethical care and insinuates accountability for healthcare institutions and professionals. Furthermore, accurate documents provide a rigorous foundation for conducting appropriate quality of care analysis that can facilitate better health outcomes for patients. Thus, regardless of the format used to capture the clinical point of care information, these documents are imperative in providing safe healthcare. Electronic formats of clinical point of care documentation are not intended to replace existing clinical process, but to enhance the current clinical point of care documentation process.

=== Traditional approach ===
One of the major responsibilities for nurses in healthcare settings is to forward information about the patient's needs and treatment to other healthcare professionals. Traditionally, this has been done verbally. However, today information technology has made its entrance into the healthcare system whereby verbal transfer of information is becoming obsolete. In the past few decades, nurses have witnessed a change toward a more independent practice with explicit knowledge of nursing care. The obligation to point of care documentation not only applies to the performed interventions, medical and nursing, but also impacts the decision-making process; explaining why a specific action has been prompted by the nurse. The main benefit of point of care documentation is advancing structured communication between healthcare professionals to ensure the continuity of patient care. Without a structured care plan that is closely followed, care tends to become fragmented.

=== Electronic documentation ===
Point of care (POC) documentation is the ability for clinicians to document clinical information while interacting with and delivering care to patients. The increased adoption of electronic health records (EHR) in healthcare institutions and practices creates the need for electronic POC documentation through the use of various medical devices. POC documentation is meant to assist clinicians by minimizing time spent on documentation and maximizing time for patient care. The type of medical devices used is important in ensuring that documentation can be effectively integrated into the clinical workflow of a particular clinical environment.

==== Devices ====
Mobile technologies such as personal digital assistants (PDAs), laptop computers and tablets enable documentation at the point of care. The selection of a mobile computing platform is contingent upon the amount and complexity of data. To ensure successful implementation, it is important to examine the strengths and limitations of each device. Tablets are more functional for high volume and complex data entry, and are favoured for their screen size, and capacity to run more complex functions. PDAs are more functional for low volume and simple data entry and are preferred for their lightweight, portability and long battery life.

==== Electronic medical record ====
An electronic medical record (EMR) contains patient's current and past medical history. The types of information captured within this document include patient's medical history, medication allergies, immunization statuses, laboratory and diagnostic test images, vital signs and patient demographics. This type of electronic documentation enables healthcare providers to use evidence-based decision support tools and share the document via the Internet. Moreover, there are two types of software included within EMR: practice management and EMR clinical software. Consequently, the EMR is able to capture both the administrative and clinical data.

==== Computer physician order entries ====
A computerized physician order entry allows medical practitioners to input medical instructions and treatment plans for the patients at the point of care. CPOE also enable healthcare practitioners to use decision support tools to detect medication prescription errors and override non-standard medication regimes that may cause fatalities. Furthermore, embedded algorithms may be chosen for people of certain age and weight to further support the clinical point of care interaction. Overall, such systems reduce errors due to illegible writing on paper and transcribing errors.

==== Mobile EMRs mHealth ====
Mobile devices and tablets provide accessibility to the Electronic Medical Record during the clinical point of care documentation process. Mobile technologies such as Android phones, iPhones, BlackBerrys, and tablets feature touchscreens to further support the ease of use for the physicians. Furthermore, mobile EMR applications support workflow portability needs due to which clinicians can document patient information at the patient's bedside.

=== Advantages ===
==== Workflow ====
The use of POC documentation devices changes clinical practice by affecting workflow processes and communication. With the availability of POC documentation devices, for example, nurses can avoid having to go to their deskspace and wait for a desktop computer to become available. They are able to move from patient to patient, eliminating steps in work process altogether. Furthermore, redundant tasks are avoided as data is captured directly from the particular encounter without the need for transcription.

==== Safety ====
A delay between face-to-face patient care and clinical documentation can cause corruption of data, leading to errors in treatment. Giving clinicians the ability to document clinical information when and where care is being delivered allows for accuracy and timeliness, contributing to increased patient safety in a dynamic and highly interruptive environment. Point of care documentation can reduce errors in a variety of clinical tasks including diagnostics, medication prescribing and medication administration.

==== Collaboration and communication ====
Ineffective communication among patient care team members is a root cause of medical errors and other adverse events. Point of care documentation facilitates the continuity of high quality care and improves communication between nurses and other healthcare providers. Proper documentation at the point of care can optimize flow of information among various clinicians and enhances communication. Clinicians can avoid going to a workstation and can access patient information at the bedside. It will also enable the timeliness of documentation, which is important to prevent adverse events.

==== Nurse-patient time ====
Literature from various studies show that approximately 25-50% of a nurse's shift is spent on documentation. As most documentation is done in the traditional manner, that is using paper and pen, enabling a POC documentation device could potentially allow 25-50% more time at the bedside. Using speech recognition and information has been studied . as a way to support nurses in POC documentation with encouraging results: 5276 of 7277 test words were recognised correctly and information extraction achieved the F1 of 0.86 in the category for irrelevant text and the macro-averaged F1 of 0.70 over the remaining 35 nonempty categories of the nursing handover form with our 101 test documents.

=== Disadvantages ===
==== Complexities ====
Numerous point of care documentation systems produce data redundancies, inconsistencies and irregularities of charting. Some electronic formats are repetitious and time-consuming. Moreover, some point of care documentation from one setting to another without a standardized pattern, and there are no guidelines for standards to documenting. Inaccessibility also causes time to be lost in searching for charts. These issues all lead to wasted time, increasing costs and uncomfortable charting. A study adopted both qualitative and quantitative methods have confirmed complexities in point of care documentation. The study has also categorized these complexities into three themes: disruption of documentation; incompleteness in charting; and inappropriate charting. As a result, these barriers limit nurses competence, motivation and confidence; ineffective nursing procedures; and inadequate nursing auditing, supervision and staff development.

==== Privacy and security ====
When examining the use of any type of technology in healthcare its important to remember that technology holds private personal health information. As such, security measures need to be in place to minimize the risk for breaches of privacy and patient confidentiality. Depending on the country you live in its important to ensure that legislation standards are met. According to Collier in 2012, privacy and confidentiality breaches are rising largely attributed to the lack of appropriate encryption technology. For successful implementation of any health technologies it is vital to ensure adequate security measures are used such as strong encryption technology.

=== Countries ===
==== Canada ====
Ontario

The adoption of electronic formats of clinical point of care documentation is particularly low in Ontario. Consequently, provincial leaders such as eHealth Ontario and Ontario MD provide financial and technical assistance in supporting electronic documentation of clinical point of care through EMR. Furthermore, currently more than six million Ontarians have EMR; however, by 2012 this number is expected to increase to 10 million citizens. Conclusively, continued efforts are being made to adopt charting of patient information in electronic format to improve the quality of clinical point of care services

== See also ==
- Adoption of Electronic Medical Records in U.S. Hospitals
- Personal health record
- Point-of-care testing
