= Bellevue Medical Center (Nebraska) =

Hospital in Bellevue, Nebraska

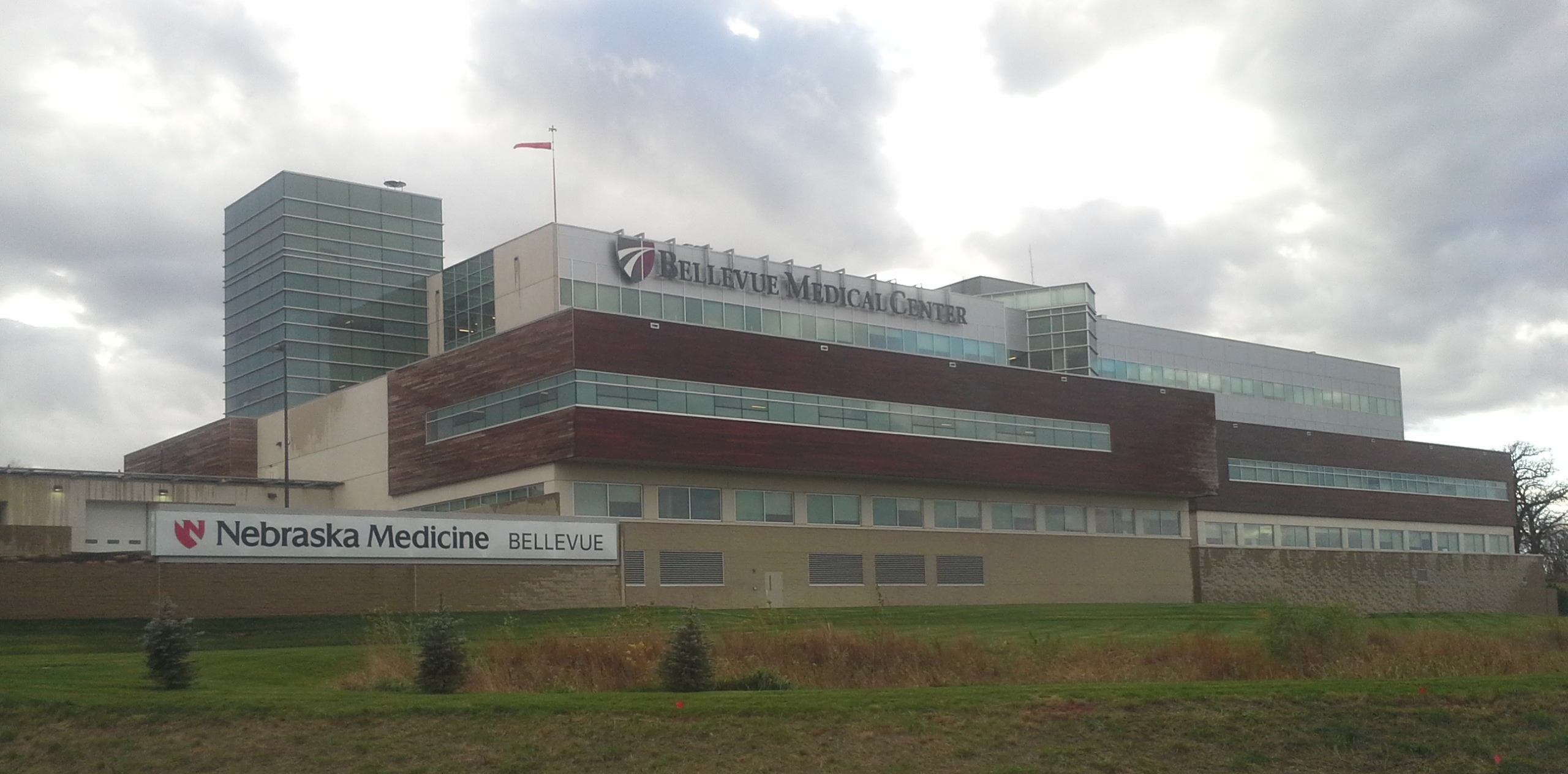
- Bellevue Medical Center in 2014

Geography
- Location: Bellevue, Nebraska, United States
- Coordinates: 41.137200°N 95.948100°W

Organization
- Care system: Private non-profit
- Type: General
- Religious affiliation: Secular
- Affiliated university: University of Nebraska Medical Center

Services
- Beds: 91

Helipads
- Helipad: Yes
Number	Length		Surface
Number	ft	m	Surface
	44	13

Links
- Website: www.nebraskamed.com/bellevue
- Lists: Hospitals in the United States

Bellevue Medical Center is a general hospital that is located in Bellevue, Nebraska, United States. It has 91 licensed beds. The hospital is owned and operated by Nebraska Medicine, a private, not-for-profit, healthcare organization that is affiliated with University of Nebraska Medical Center.

== History ==
Bellevue Medical Center was announced in late 2006 and construction began in early 2007. Bellevue Medical Center officially opened in 2010. In 2014, the hospital began an affiliation with the newly-formed Nebraska Medicine. In 2016, Nebraska Medicine purchased the hospital for $130 million.

== Facilities ==
Bellevue Medical Center has an emergency department with a level I trauma center and a helipad. It also has an immediate care clinic and an outpatient pharmacy. It also houses specialist facilities, including aquatic therapy, aesthetic surgery, endocrinology, intensive care, orthopedics, pain management, and physical and occupational therapies.

== See also ==
- Hospitals in Omaha, Nebraska
- History of Bellevue, Nebraska
