= Project Health Tower =

Planned high-rise health facility in Omaha, Nebraska

- Rendering of the proposed project

General information
- Status: Under construction
- Type: Medical
- Location: 4441 Farnam St., Omaha, Nebraska, U.S.
- Coordinates: 41.25674689864597°N 95.97956226842685°W
- Groundbreaking: April 2025
- Estimated completion: 2030
- Cost: US$2.19 billion

Height
- Height: 380 to 400 feet (116 to 122 m) (estimated)

Technical details
- Floor count: 18–20
- Beds: 550

Website
- www.unmc.edu/project-health/

Project Health Tower is an under-construction high-rise health facility currently being built in Midtown Omaha, Nebraska, United States. The building is being developed by University of Nebraska Medical Center and Nebraska Medicine for use as a training facility and main hospital. The hospital began construction in April 2025 and is estimated to be completed in 2030. Project Health Tower is planned to have 18 to 20 floors and is estimated to be 380 to 400 feet (116 to 122 m) tall upon completion.

== History ==
=== Background ===
Project Health Tower is the first phase of the University of Nebraska Medical Center's (UNMC) Project NExT. Project Health was officially announced in October 2023. Project Health is currently being built on the site of the former Hattie B. Munroe Pavilion. The building was demolished in 2022 after operations moved to Central Omaha.

=== Development ===
Project Health Tower was formally unveiled in August 2024, after receiving regent approval. It is planned to be used by UNMC as a training facility, and by Nebraska Medicine as a primary hospital. The facility is estimated to cost around US$2.19 billion and will include 550 beds. Project Health Tower is expected to replace the Clarkson Hospital Tower, which was built in 1955.

=== Construction ===
Construction began in April 2025 with foundational work expected to begin in 2026. Project Health Tower is expected to be completed around 2030.

== Design ==
Project Health tower is planned to be 18-20 floors tall and will have an estimated height between 380 and 400 feet (116 and 122 m). The building is planned to hold 550 beds and will contain approximately 1.25 million square feet (116,000 m^{2}) of space.
