= Carol Remmer Angle =

American pediatrician/nephrologist/toxicologist

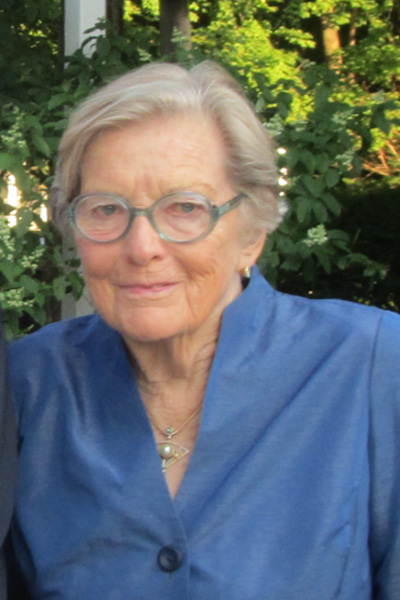
- Carol Remmer Angle, 2012.
- Born: December 20, 1927 (age 98)
- Education: Wellesley College Cornell Medical School
- Occupations: Pediatrician, Nephrologist, Toxicologist
- Spouse: Dr. William Angle (deceased 1993)
- Children: Dr. Marcia Angle; Dr. John F. Angle; Monica Angle

Carol Remmer Angle is an American pediatrician, nephrologist, and toxicologist. Angle is known as one of the nation's leading researchers on lead poisoning. She is professor emeritus at the University of Nebraska Medical Center (UNMC) in Omaha, Nebraska. Angle joined UNMC in 1954 and was one of the first women to serve as chair of an academic medical department (pediatrics).

She also served as chief of pediatric nephrology, director of the pediatric intensive care unit, and director of medical toxicology. In 1957, Angle along with Dr. Matilda McIntire, founded one of the country's first poison control centers. Angle is a founding member and a prior president of the American Association of Poison Control Centers. For forty years, Angle served as an expert for NIEHS, National Institutes of Health and U.S. Environmental Protection Agency panels investigating heavy metal toxicity. Angle continues as a toxicology consultant, reviewer and editor.

== Education and training ==
Angle studied English literature at Wellesley College and graduated in 1948; she later attended Cornell Medical School, and took a residency at New York Hospital Pediatric. Afterward, she began working at the University of Nebraska Hospital.

== Offices held and honors ==
- Director, Medical Education, Children's Memorial Hospital, Omaha, Nebraska, 1954-1967
- Director, Nebraska Master Poison Control Center, 1957-1966
- State Coordinator, Nebraska Master Poison Control Center, 1957-1966
- Director, Pediatric Renal Clinic, University of Nebraska Hospital & Clinics, 1966-1984
- Director, Pediatric Intensive Care Unit, University of Nebraska Hospital, 1968-1974
- Program Chairman, American Association of Poison Control Centers, 1977-1979
- Professor, Department of Pediatrics, University of Nebraska College of Medicine, 1971-1998
- Director, National Foundation Birth Defects Treatment Center, Children's Memorial Hospital, 1974-1981
- Member, Toxicology Advisory Board, U.S. Consumer Product Safety Commission, 1978-1982
- Chairman, Department of Pediatrics, University of Nebraska College of Medicine, 1981-1985
- Member, National Advisory Environmental Health Sciences Council, NIH, 1984-1987
- Director, Clinical Toxicology, University of Nebraska Medical Center, 1985-1998
- Editor-in-Chief, Journal of Toxicology: Clinical Toxicology, 1989-2002
- Professor Emeritus, Department of Pediatrics, University of Nebraska College of Medicine, 1999–present
- Honor Award, Matthew J. Ellenhorn Award, 2003
- Honor Award, University of Nebraska Medical Center Legends Award, 2008

== Selected works ==
- Angle, C. R. (1954). "Congenital bowing and angulation of long bones". Pediatrics. 13 (3): 257–268. doi:10.1542/peds.13.3.257. PMID 13155074.
- Angle, C. R. (1963). "Poison Control Outlines: Toxicity of Insecticides and Herbicides". The Nebraska State Medical Journal. 48: 644–646. PMID 14089947.
- Angle, C. R.; McIntire, M. S. (1964). "Lead Poisoning During Pregnancy. Fetal Tolerance of Calcium Disodium Edetate". American Journal of Diseases of Children. 108: 436–439. doi:10.1001/archpedi.1964.02090010438016. PMID 14186666.
- Angle CR (1966). "Acute renal failure". Lancet. 300 (7768): 134. doi:10.1016/s0140-6736(72)91619-4. PMID 4113914.
- Angle, C. R.; McIntire, M. S. (1966). "Evaluation of a poison information center". The Journal-Lancet. 86 (7): 363–365. PMID 5939583.
- Angle, C. R.; McIntire, M. S.; Moore, R. C. (1967). "Cloverleaf skull: Kleeblattschädel-deformity syndrome". American Journal of Diseases of Children. 114 (2): 198–202. doi:10.1001/archpedi.1967.02090230128018. PMID 4951548.
- Angle CR, McIntire MS, Zetterman RA (1968). "CNS symptoms in childhood poisoning". Clin Toxicol. 1: 19–29. doi:10.3109/15563656808990553.
- Angle CR, McIntire MS, Meile R (1968). "Neurologic sequelae of poisoning in children". J Pediatr. 73 (4): 531–539. doi:10.1016/s0022-3476(68)80268-9.
- Angle, C. R.; McIntire, M. S. (1968). "Persistent dystonia in a brain-damaged child after ingestion of phenothiazine". The Journal of Pediatrics. 73 (1): 124–126. doi:10.1016/s0022-3476(68)80050-2. PMID 5658620.
- Angle, C. R.; Glyn, M. (1969). "The value of a pediatric high intensity care unit". The Nebraska State Medical Journal. 54 (11): 737–740. PMID 4242184.
- Angle CR (1971). "Symposium on iron poisoning". Clin Toxicol. 4 (4): 525–527. doi:10.3109/15563657108990975. PMID 5164169.
- Angle, C. R.; McIntire, M. S. (1974). "Red cell lead, whole blood lead, and red cell enzymes". Environmental Health Perspectives. 7: 133–137. Bibcode:1974EnvHP...7..133A. doi:10.1289/ehp.747133. PMC 1475113. PMID 4364646.
- Angle, C. R.; Wermers, J. (1974). "Human poisoning with flea-dip concentrate". Journal of the American Veterinary Medical Association. 165 (2): 174–175. PMID 4837827.
- Angle, C. R.; McIntire, M. S.; Vest, G. (1975). "Blood lead of Omaha school children--topographic correlation with industry, traffic and housing". The Nebraska Medical Journal. 60 (4): 97–102. PMID 48205.
- Angle, C. R. (1975). "Locomotor skills and school accidents". Pediatrics. 56 (5): 819–822. doi:10.1542/peds.56.5.819. PMID 1196740.
- Angle, C. R.; McIntire, M. S.; Brunk, G. (1977). "Effect of anemia on blood and tissue lead in rats". Journal of Toxicology and Environmental Health. 3 (3): 557–563. Bibcode:1977JTEH....3..557A. doi:10.1080/15287397709529587. PMID 926207.
- Angle CR, Trembath EJ, Strond W (1977). "The myelodysplasia and hydrocephalus program in Nebraska: A 15 year review of cost and benefits, Park I.". Nebr Med J. 62: 359–361.
- Angle, C. R.; Trembath, E. J.; Strond, W. L. (1977). "The myelodysplasia and hydrocephalus program in Nebraska: A 15 year review of costs and benefits". The Nebraska Medical Journal. 62 (11): 391–393. PMID 412114.
- Angle CR, McIntire MS (1977). "Lead, mercury and cadmium: toxicity in children". Paediatrician. 6: 204–225.
- Angle, C. R.; McIntire, M. S. (1978). "Low level lead and inhibition of erythrocyte pyrimidine nucleotidase". Environmental Research. 17 (2): 296–302. Bibcode:1978ER.....17..296A. doi:10.1016/0013-9351(78)90032-4. PMID 233817.
- Angle, C. R.; McIntire, M. S. (1979). "Environmental lead and children: The Omaha study". Journal of Toxicology and Environmental Health. 5 (5): 855–870. Bibcode:1979JTEH....5..855A. doi:10.1080/15287397909529795. PMID 583166.
- Angle, C. R.; Stohs, S. J.; McIntire, M. S.; Swanson, M. S.; Rovang, K. S. (1980). "Lead-induced accumulation of erythrocyte pyrimidine nucleotides in the rabbit". Toxicology and Applied Pharmacology. 54 (1): 161–167. Bibcode:1980ToxAP..54..161A. doi:10.1016/0041-008x(80)90017-4. PMID 7394785.
- Angle, C. R. (1981). "The Department of Pediatrics, University of Nebraska Medical Center". The Nebraska Medical Journal. 66 (3): 53–54. PMID 7231593.
- Angle, C. R.; McIntire, M. S.; Swanson, M. S.; Stohs, S. J. (1982). "Erythrocyte nucleotides in children--increased blood lead and cytidine triphosphate". Pediatric Research. 16 (4 Pt 1): 331–334. doi:10.1203/00006450-198204000-00019. PMID 7079004.
- Angle, C. R.; O'Brien, T. P.; McIntire, M. S. (1983). "Adolescent self-poisoning: A nine-year followup". Journal of Developmental and Behavioral Pediatrics. 4 (2): 83–87. doi:10.1097/00004703-198306000-00001. PMID 6874961. S2CID 7923208.
- Angle, C. R.; Marcus, A.; Cheng, I. H.; McIntire, M. S. (1984). "Omaha childhood blood lead and environmental lead: A linear total exposure model". Environmental Research. 35 (1): 160–170. Bibcode:1984ER.....35..160A. doi:10.1016/0013-9351(84)90123-3. PMID 6489285.
- Angle, C. R.; Swanson, M. S.; Stohs, S. J.; Markin, R. S. (1985). "Abnormal erythrocyte pyrimidine nucleotides in uremic subjects". Nephron. 39 (3): 169–174. doi:10.1159/000183366. PMID 2983249.
- Angle, C. R.; Kuntzelman, D. R. (1989). "Increased erythrocyte protoporphyrins and blood lead—a pilot study of childhood growth patterns". Journal of Toxicology and Environmental Health. 26 (2): 149–156. Bibcode:1989JTEHA..26..149A. doi:10.1080/15287398909531241. PMID 2921779.
- Angle, C. R.; Thomas, D. J.; Swanson, S. A. (1990). "Toxicity of cadmium to rat osteosarcoma cells (ROS 17/2.8): Protective effect of 1 alpha,25-dihydroxyvitamin D3". Toxicology and Applied Pharmacology. 103 (1): 113–120. doi:10.1016/0041-008x(90)90267-x. PMID 2315924.
- Angle, C. R.; Thomas, D. J.; Swanson, S. A. (1990). "Lead inhibits the basal and stimulated responses of a rat osteoblast-like cell line ROS 17/2.8 to 1 alpha,25-dihydroxyvitamin D3 and IGF-I". Toxicology and Applied Pharmacology. 103 (2): 281–287. doi:10.1016/0041-008x(90)90230-r. PMID 2330589.
- Angle CR, Thomas DJ, Swanson SA (1993). "Osteotoxicity of cadmium and lead in HOS TE 85 and ROS 17/2.8 cells: Relation to metallothionein induction and mitochondrial binding". BioMetals. 5: 179–184.
- Angle, C. R.; Manton, W. I.; Stanek, K. L. (1995). "Stable isotope identification of lead sources in preschool children--the Omaha Study". Journal of Toxicology. Clinical Toxicology. 33 (6): 657–662. doi:10.3109/15563659509010624. PMID 8523488.
- Angle CR, Swanson SA: Arsenite enhances homocysteine-induced proliferation of fibroblasts in human aortic smooth muscle cells in B12 (Cobalamin) deficient media. Submitted to Environmental Health Perspectives, July 1997.
- Angle, C. R. (2002). "Pitfalls of correlation of childhood blood lead and cognitive development". Journal of Toxicology. Clinical Toxicology. 40 (4): 521–522. PMID 12217008.
