= Dr. Nancy =

- Presented by: Dr. Nancy Snyderman
- Country of origin: United States

Production
- Production locations: NBC Studios; New York, New York
- Running time: 60 minutes

Original release
- Network: MSNBC
- Release: June 29 – December 23, 2009

Related
- MSNBC Live

The name Dr. Nancy may also refer to Dr. Nancy E. Gary.

Dr. Nancy is a program on MSNBC hosted by Dr. Nancy Snyderman. It aired weekdays at noon Eastern Time. The show launched on June 29, 2009, as part of a sweeping revamp of MSNBC's daytime weekday programs along with Morning Meeting with Dylan Ratigan, a revamp of the channel's graphics, and its launch in high definition. Topics on the show generally related to health and/or politics. Monica Novotny served as breaking news anchor during the show.

On December 23, 2009, MSNBC announced that it cancelled the program due to low ratings. Its final broadcast aired on December 17, 2009.
