= John Nwangwu =

Nigerian-born epidemiologist (born 1952)

John Tochukwu Nwangwu
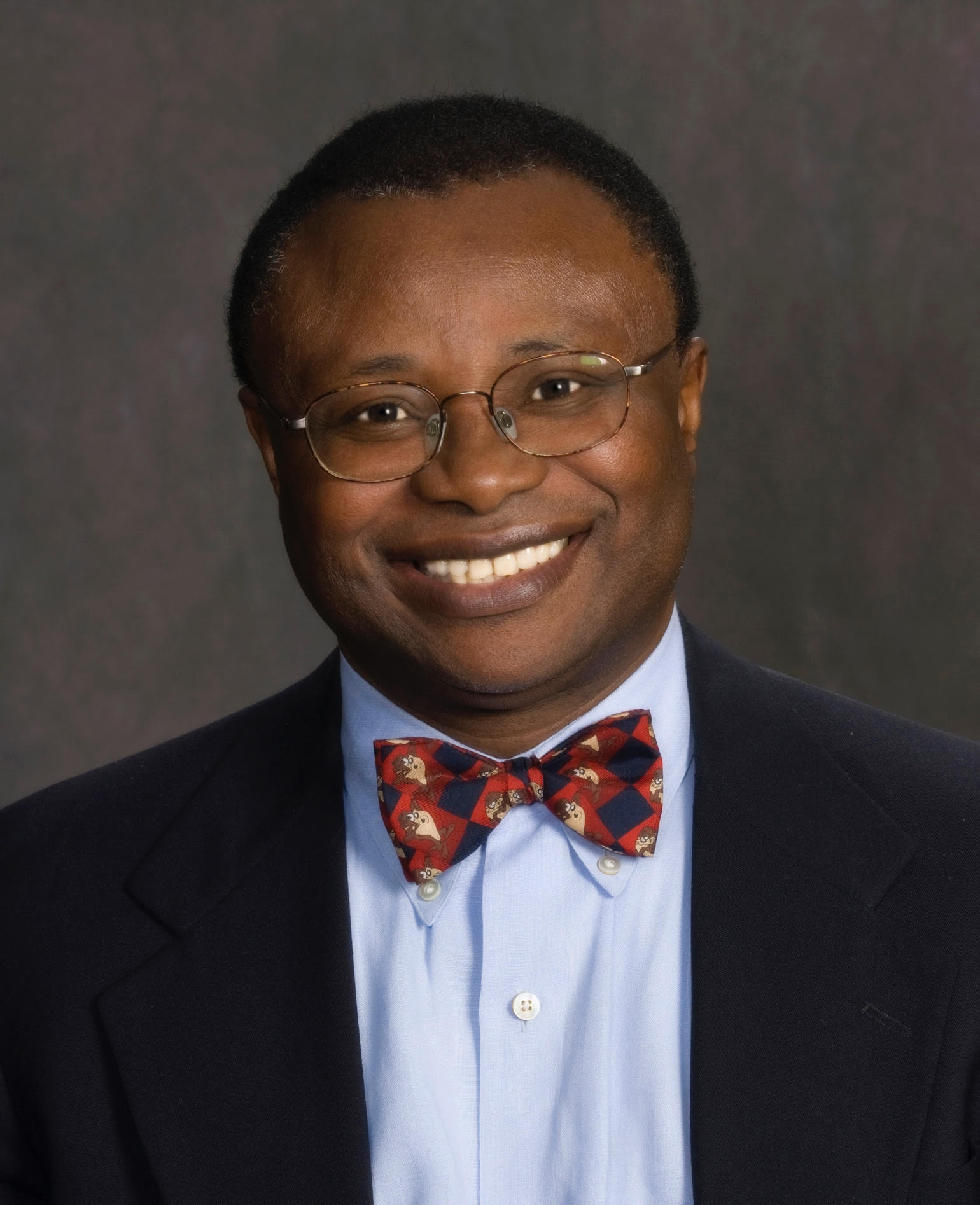
- Born: 1952 (age 73–74); Umuahia, Abia State, Nigeria
- Scientific career
- Fields: Epidemiology and Infectious Diseases
- Workplaces: Yale University and Southern Connecticut State University Previous/Other Affiliations: Columbia University, Harvard University, Johns Hopkins University, Princeton University, National Institutes of Health, Centers for Disease Control and Prevention, Kern County Health Department, Loma Linda University, University of Nebraska Medical Center, Dana–Farber Cancer Institute, and Erasmus University

John Tochukwu Nwangwu is a Nigerian-American public health doctor with expertise in infectious diseases and epidemiology, a consultant at the World Health Organization and a professor at both Yale University and Southern Connecticut State University (SCSU). At Yale University, he holds the position of Clinical Professor of Infectious Diseases and Epidemiology. While at SCSU he holds the position of Professor of Epidemiology and Global Health.

== Early life ==
Nwangwu was born in 1952 in Umuahia—now located in Abia State, Nigeria, where his father was a civil servant to the Public Works Department (PWD), a governmental department. His parents, Sidney and Phoebe Nwangwu, were from Ogidi and Umudioka respectively, in Anambra State Nigeria. He is the third of six children

During the Biafra War, he joined the medical unit (International Red Cross) of Biafra's Army. Following the war, after completing his secondary education, the opportunity to migrate to the United States of America arose.

== Education ==
He received his undergraduate medical degree from the University of Nebraska Medical Center College of Medicine in 1979, and his Masters of Public Health from Loma Linda University Medical Center's school of Public Health in 1982. He held a Fellowship in Infections Diseases at Columbia Presbyterian Medical Center in New York City and received his doctorate in Public Health from the Columbia University Mailman School of Public Health in 1988. Nwangwu's education continued at Erasmus University Medical School, in Rotterdam, The Netherlands where he completed his post-doctoral training.

== Career ==
In his work with the World Health Organization, Nwangwu provides expertise in the fields of infectious disease and epidemiology throughout the world.

Between March 2013 and July 2014, Nwangwu consulted with WHO on the Ebola outbreak working on the ground in Guinea, Sierra Leone, and Liberia following the onset of the soon to be pandemic. He has been featured in several interviews regarding his experiences with the disease including the PBS Nova Documentary Ebola: The Plague Fighters, where the 1995 outbreak of Ebola in Kikwit, Zaire, is investigated.

Nwangwu has been educating and training healthcare providers since 1982. He has held academic appointments in numerous institutions including, Columbia University, Yale University, Harvard University, Princeton University, Johns Hopkins University, Southern Connecticut State University, and University of Connecticut. He joined the faculty of Southern Connecticut State University in 1991, becoming a tenured professor in 1995.

His hospital appointments include, Columbia Presbyterian Medical Center in New York City where he served as Director of the Tropical Disease Clinic, Director for Infection Control and Epidemiology at the VA Hospital in Rocky Hill Connecticut, and the Dana Farber Cancer Institute in Boston Massachusetts as a faculty visiting scholar.

He joined the Kern County Health Department in California as the Chief Epidemiologist and then the Director of Epidemiology and Data Management.

Nwangwu is currently a fellow of the American College of Epidemiology, The Royal Society of Medicine, The American Board of Tropical Medicine, The Society for Healthcare Epidemiology of America, and The New York Academy of Sciences.

== Publications ==
Early publications include those in The Journal of Clinical Toxicology, and The Connecticut Review. More recent publications appear in Emerging Infectious Diseases, Annals of Epidemiology, Eastern Cooperative Oncology Group, and Advances in Infectious Diseases.

Nwangwu serves on the editorial boards of six journals, including Advances in Infectious Diseases where he is the editor in chief.

== Personal life ==
Since 1997, Nwangwu has led teams of medical providers on service trips to Nigeria, providing comprehensive healthcare to thousands.

In addition, Nwangwu serves on the Board of a number of organizations including: MedSend, the Overseas Ministries Study Center, Faithcare Inc., Kateri Medical Services Inc., and Fanafi Worldwide.
