= Clarkson College =

Private health college in Omaha, Nebraska, US

Coordinates: 41°15′33″N 95°58′30″W

- Type: Private college
- Established: 1888
- Affiliations: Nebraska Medicine
- Religious affiliation: Episcopal Church
- President: Andreia Nebel, Ed.D., PT., DPT., FNAP
- Students: 1,178
- Location: Omaha, Nebraska, United States
- Campus: Urban
- Website: clarksoncollege.edu

Clarkson College is a private health sciences college in Omaha, Nebraska, United States. The college was founded in 1888 by Meliora Clarkson following the death of her husband Bishop Robert Clarkson of the Episcopal Church. It is affiliated with Nebraska Medicine. Total student enrollment was 1,178 in fall 2018.

== History ==
Clarkson College was originally founded as a part of the Bishop Clarkson Memorial Hospital in 1888. The college was founded by Meliora Clarkson. Both the college and the hospital were named for the late-Bishop Robert Clarkson. The campus was originally located inside of the hospital on Dodge and between Seventeenth and Eighteenth Streets. Due to the hospital's small size, the campus moved with the hospital to a new location on Harney Street in 1908.

In 1936, the hospital and college moved again, this time to a larger building at 26th and Dewey Streets. Following financial struggle throughout the 1950s, the Bishop Clarkson Memorial School of Nursing closed in 1955. However, following a donation from Peter and Evelyn Kiewit, the college re-opened with a new building in 1960. The building, then-known as Kiewit Hall, was located at Dewey Avenue at 44th Street.

In 1981, the college received approval to create a four-year nursing program in partnership with Bellevue College. Such decision had been controversial and attempted beforehand. In spite of the criticism, the program received approval from the Nebraska Coordinating Commission for Postsecondary Education. The following year, the college re-branded to Bishop Clarkson College. In 1992, the college re-branded to Clarkson College and moved its campus to 101 S. 42nd Street into the former Physicians Mutual headquarters and renovated it for college use.

In 1997, Clarkson College's hospital affiliate, Clarkson Hospital, merged with the hospital under University of Nebraska Medical Center to form the Nebraska Medical Center, now known as Nebraska Medicine. Additionally, the college continued its partnership with the hospital.

== Academics ==
Undergraduate demographics as of 2025
Race and ethnicity	Total
White	65%
Hispanic	5%
Black	9%
Two or more races	16%
Asian	4%
Unknown	1%
Economic diversity
Low-income (Note: The percentage of students who received an income-based federal Pell grant intended for low-income students.)	32%
Affluent (Note: The percentage of students who are a part of the American middle class at the bare minimum.)	68%

Clarkson College is a private health sciences college. The college is accredited by the Higher Learning Commission and offers certificate, undergraduate, graduate, and post-graduate options in healthcare fields. As of 2025, the college enrolls 611 undergraduate students. The college includes eleven undergraduate fields of study. Major fields of study include Registered Nursing, Allied Health Diagnostic, and Allied Health and Medical Assisting Services. The college also includes a partnership with Nebraska Medicine.

== Campus ==
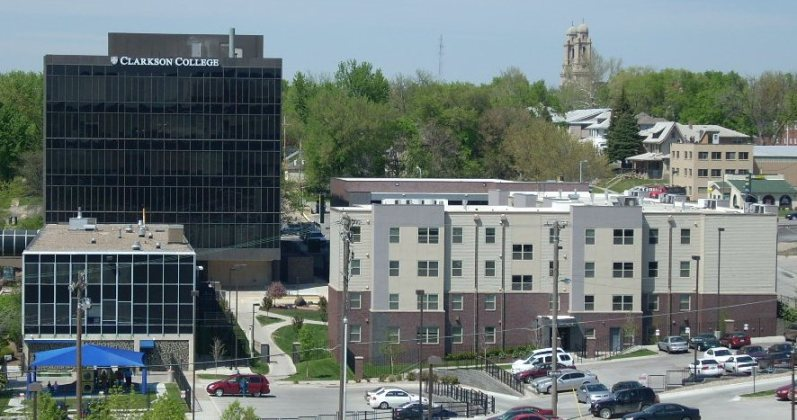
View of the Clarkson College campus in 2008

Clarkson College's main campus is located in Omaha, Nebraska, United States. The college includes five major buildings. These include the main entrance and admissions office, the Success Center and Howard Hall, a residence hall, a 3D printing and training center, and the Clarkson Commons & Education Center.
