= Nancy Snyderman =

American journalist

Nancy Snyderman MD
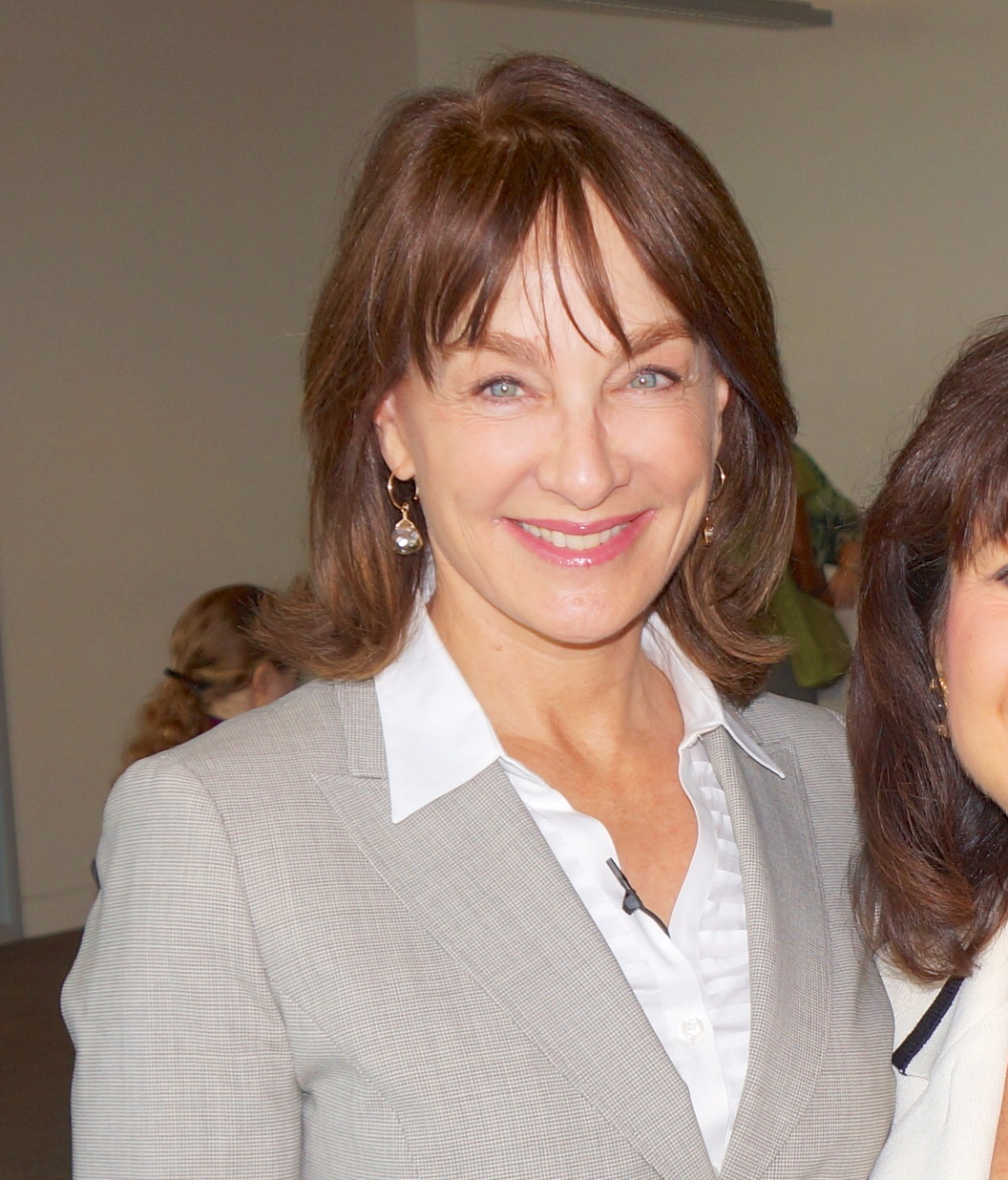
- Snyderman in 2013
- Born: Nancy Lynn Snyderman; March 26, 1952 (age 74); St. Louis, Missouri, U.S.
- Education: • Indiana University Bloomington • University of Nebraska Medical Center
- Occupations: Journalist; physician
- Years active: 1983–present
- Spouse: Doug Myers
- Children: 3

Nancy Lynn Snyderman (born March 26, 1952) is an American physician, author, and former broadcast journalist. She served as a medical correspondent for ABC News for 15 years, and was the chief medical editor for NBC News from 2006 to 2015, frequently appearing on the Today show, NBC Nightly News and MSNBC to discuss medical-related issues. Snyderman is also on the staff of the otolaryngology-head and neck surgery department at the University of Pennsylvania, located in Philadelphia, Pennsylvania.

In 2013, Snyderman launched her own website, where she answers health and medical questions. She is a co-founder of CarePlanners, a service that helps people navigate the healthcare system.

In 2015, Snyderman left NBC News following a high-profile controversy over violating an Ebola quarantine.

== Early life, education, and family ==
Snyderman was born in St. Louis, Missouri, the daughter of Joy Snyderman, a housewife, and Sanford Snyderman, a physician. She has a younger brother who is a physician as well. She grew up in Ft. Wayne, Indiana, where she graduated from South Side High School in 1970. She attended Indiana University Bloomington, earning a Bachelor of Arts degree in microbiology. Snyderman went on to attend medical school at the University of Nebraska Medical Center, located in Omaha, Nebraska, earning a Doctor of Medicine degree from its College of Medicine in 1977. She presently lives in Princeton, New Jersey with her husband, Doug. She has three children, Kate, Rachel, and Charlie.

Snyderman states that she knew already in the third grade that she wanted to be a physician when her father brought her with him on his Sunday hospital rounds. She counts her father and mother and one of her instructors, Eugene Nicholas Myers, the chief of surgery in Pittsburgh, as her mentors. She says that Myers "taught me how to be a really good surgeon. He invested time in me; and it's a lot for him that I vowed no matter what my other careers were, I would never give up medicine."

In 2011, while appearing as a panel member discussing rape on the NBC Today show, Snyderman disclosed that she was raped at gunpoint when she was a sophomore in college. Snyderman stated, "I was attacked in 1970 as a college girl and I did everything wrong. I didn't come forward. I waited too long. And by the time I would have come forward a [defense attorney] could have skewered me with questions. So I have great sensitivity for young women who have been raped." She suggested to women: "If you are an adult and you want to take the shame off of rape, one of the bravest things you can do as a woman is to come forward and say I accuse you - and I'm going to do it publicly."

== Career ==
Snyderman followed up her training with residency in both pediatrics and otolaryngology at the University of Pittsburgh and the University of Pittsburgh Medical Center in Pennsylvania. She moved to Little Rock, Arkansas, joining the surgical staff at the University of Arkansas for Medical Sciences in 1983, specializing in throat and neck cancers.

She began her broadcasting career in 1984 at KATV, the ABC affiliate in Little Rock. She served as a medical correspondent for ABC News for 15 years, and was a contributor to 20/20, Primetime, and Good Morning America. Before leaving ABC News, she was a frequent substitute co-host on Good Morning America.

Snyderman also served as vice president of consumer education for the health care corporation Johnson & Johnson, where she headed "Understanding Health", an educational initiative which focused on public education about health and medicine.

In 1988, she moved to San Francisco, California, where she practiced head and neck surgery at the University of California San Francisco and California Pacific Medical Center. In the 1990s, Snydermann served as a medical correspondent for KPIX-TV in San Francisco.

Snyderman joined NBC News as its chief medical editor in September 2006. Her reports have appeared on Today, NBC Nightly News with Brian Williams, Dateline NBC, MSNBC and MSNBC.com. She hosted the MSNBC program Dr. Nancy, in 2009. She served as a sports desk reporter for NBC Sports coverage of both the 2008 Summer Olympics. and the 2014 Winter Olympics. She has reported on wide-ranging medical topics affecting both men and women, and has traveled the world extensively, reporting from many of the world's most-troubled areas.

In 2013, Snyderman launched her own website where she answers health and medical questions, takes suggestions for upcoming story ideas for NBC, and contributes a daily video and written blog. In 2016, she was named to the board of directors of the pharmaceutical company Alkermes.

Snyderman is a co-founder of CarePlanners, a service that helps people navigate the healthcare system. She states that she understood the need for a service like CarePlanners after she became responsible for her parents' care in 2005.

== Recognition ==
Snyderman has received numerous awards for her medical broadcast reporting, including several Emmy Awards, Edward R. Murrow Award, an Alfred I. duPont Award, and a Gracie Awards. In 1986 she received an award for in-depth reporting from KARK-TV, and an Associated Press award for "best documentary" for her work on sex education in Arkansas in 1987. She received the "Distinguished Service Award" from the American Academy of Otolaryngology's Head and Neck Surgery Foundation in 1998. Among many recent honors, in 2001 she received the Athena Award from the Partnership for Women's Health at Columbia University for her work in the field of women's health. Also in 2001, she earned the Trailblazer Award from the American Women in Radio and Television for furthering the knowledge of women's health on a national level. South Side High School Distinguished Alumni Award 1996.

== Selective abortion advocacy ==
Snyderman has stated that she supports selective abortion as a result of the detection of the presence of congenital disorders in the fetus before birth, proclaiming it to be "the science of today" and "I believe that this is a great way to prevent diseases."

== Ebola quarantine ==
In 2014, after returning from Liberia, where she was in contact with a freelance cameraman who contracted Ebola, Snyderman and the remainder of her crew were asked to observe a voluntary 21-day quarantine to minimize the risk of further outbreak. After Snyderman was then seen inside a car, outside a local restaurant, in violation of the quarantine, the state of New Jersey issued a mandatory 21-day quarantine for Snyderman and her crew.

On March 12, 2015, Snyderman announced she had resigned her position as NBC's Chief Medical Editor due to the controversy over her breaking the quarantine.

== Books ==
- Snyderman, Nancy L.; Blackstone, Margaret (1996). Dr. Nancy Snyderman's Guide to Good Health – What Every Forty-Plus Woman Should Know about Her Changing Body. New York City: William Morrow and Company. ISBN 978-0-688-12979-8.
- Snyderman, Nancy L.; Streep, Peg (2000). Necessary Journeys – Letting Ourselves Learn from Life. New York City: Hyperion Books. ISBN 978-0-7868-6513-0.
- Snyderman, Nancy L.; Streep, Peg (2002). Girl in the Mirror – Mothers and Daughters in the Years of Adolescence. New York City: Hyperion Books. ISBN 978-0-7868-6743-1.
- Snyderman, Nancy L. (2008). Medical Myths That Can Kill You – And the 101 Truths That Will Save, Extend, and Improve Your Life. New York City: Crown Publishers. ISBN 978-0-307-40613-2.
- Snyderman, Nancy L. (2009). Diet Myths That Keep Us Fat – And the 101 Truths That Will Save Your Waistline – And Maybe Even Your Life. New York City: Crown Publishers. ISBN 978-0-307-40615-6.
