= Nebraska Medicine =

American healthcare nonprofit

Coordinates: 41°15′22″N 95°58′39″W

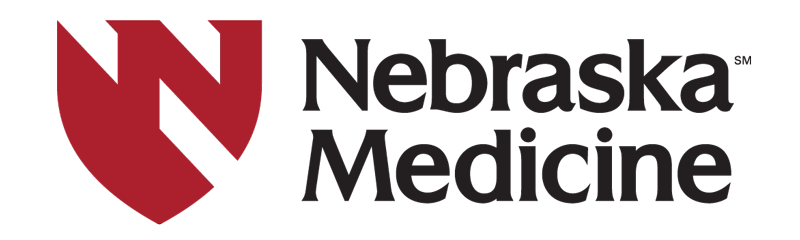
- Logo since 2014
- Formerly: Nebraska Health System; The Nebraska Medical Center
- Type: Private
- Industry: Healthcare
- Predecessor: Bishop Clarkson Hospital; University Hospital
- Founded: 1997; 29 years ago, in Omaha, Nebraska, United States
- Number of locations: 2 hospitals, 70 specialty and primary care clinics
- Areas served: Nebraska, primarily Omaha and Bellevue
- Key people: Michael Ash (CEO); Lance Fritz (chairman)
- Services: Health care
- Number of employees: 8,500+ (2025)
- Website: nebraskamed.com

Nebraska Medicine (formerly the Nebraska Medical Center and Nebraska Health System) is a private not-for-profit American healthcare company based in Omaha, Nebraska, United States. The company was created as Nebraska Health System (NHS) in 1997, when Bishop Clarkson Hospital merged with the adjacent University Hospital in midtown Omaha. Renamed the Nebraska Medical Center in 2003, in 2014 the company merged with UNMC Physicians and Bellevue Medical Center to become Nebraska Medicine. The company has full ownership of two hospitals and 70 specialty and primary care clinics in and around Omaha. Nebraska Medicine's main campus, Nebraska Medical Center, has 718 beds, while its Bellevue Medical Center campus has 91 beds.

The company operates the Nebraska Biocontainment Unit, one of 13 Level 1 Regional Special Pathogen Treatment Centers in the United States, and is particularly recognized for programs in fields such as organ transplantation, cancer treatment, gastroenterology, neurology, neurosurgery, COPD, heart bypass surgery, heart failure treatment, and hip replacement. Nebraska Medical Center has been ranked as the No. 1 hospital in Nebraska and in Omaha by U.S. News & World Report every year since 2012, The publication also ranked Nebraska Medicine's oncology, gastroenterology and G.I. surgery programs in the top 50 nationwide in 2024. Nebraska Medicine operates as an independent clinical partner of the University of Nebraska Medical Center.

== History ==
=== 1997–2003: Nebraska Health System ===
Nebraska Medicine was formed as the Nebraska Health System through the merger of Bishop Clarkson Memorial Hospital, and the University of Nebraska Medical Center's hospital in 1997. Bishop Clarkson Memorial Hospital was formed in 1869 and was an affiliate of Clarkson College. UNMC's hospital was formed in 1917. Both hospitals were adjacent to each other in Midtown Omaha. As a result of the merger, the non-profit was overseen by a board made up of UNMC and Bishop Clarkson Memorial Hospital's previous owner, Clarkson Regional Health Services, which owned the hospital since 1992.

=== 2003–2013: The Nebraska Medical Center ===
Nebraska Health System was renamed the Nebraska Medical Center in 2003, with the adjacent University of Nebraska Medical Center remaining its primary clinical partner. UNMC had been founded in 1881 as the Omaha Medical College before joining the University of Nebraska in 1902. In 2005, The Nebraska Medical Center opened the Nebraska Biocontainment Unit (NBU) as a collaboration with UNMC, also opening the Hixson-Lied Center on the Omaha campus. The Nebraska Medical Center's nearby Village Pointe Cancer Center opened in 2008. Nebraska Medicine was named one of the best hospitals in U.S. News & World Report’s 2008 publication for Cancer and Neurology & Neurosurgery. In 2010, The Nebraska Medical Center opened Bellevue Medical Center, a secondary hospital in nearby Bellevue, Sarpy County. The following year, the company began to implement a new $87 million electronic health record system.

=== 2014: Nebraska Medicine ===
In October 2014, it was announced that The Nebraska Medical Center, Bellevue Medical Center and UNMC Physicians would begin operating under Nebraska Medicine as one entity. UNMC Physicians, a clinical group formed in 1971, brought 39 ambulatory clinics and a physician's practice into Nebraska Medicine. The hospitals and clinics within the Nebraska Medicine network were also renamed, as Nebraska Medicine – Nebraska Medical Center, Bellevue Medical Center, Village Pointe Health Center, Eagle Run Health Center, and others. UNMC remained independent, but changed its branding to reflect the new Nebraska Medicine logo.

==== Ebola patient treatments ====
During September to December 2014, Nebraska Medicine became central to treating Ebola patients evacuated from Africa during the West African outbreak, utilizing its Biocontainment Unit. Nebraska Medical Center was then one of the few biocontainment units in the U.S. covered by media outlets; two American patients who had contracted the virus while working in West Africa were treated successfully, then discharged: journalist Ashoka Mukpo and missionary doctor Rick Sacra. A third patient, Sierra Leonean surgeon Martin Salia, a permanent U.S. resident who had contracted the virus while treating patients during the Ebola virus epidemic in Sierra Leone, died from the illness.

=== 2015–2019: Expansion ===
On March 23, 2015, Rosanna Morris was named interim CEO of Nebraska Medicine and Bradley Britigan was made interim president. Daniel DeBehnke succeeded as CEO and president in May 2016. In 2016, Nebraska Medicine finished an expansion of its Village Pointe location, expanding on an outpatient surgery center and clinics.

Nebraska Medicine paid $130 million in January 2016 to fully purchase Bellevue Medical Center, which it had previously been leasing. At the time, Nebraska Medicine also was partial owner of the Nebraska Orthopaedic Hospital in Omaha. In February 2016, Nebraska Medicine reached Stage 7 on the Electronic Medical Record Adoption Model (EMRAM) developed by HIMSS Analytics. In 2016, Nebraska Medicine finished an expansion of its Village Pointe location, expanding on an outpatient surgery center and clinics. After physicians at Internal Medical Associates requested the merge, in July 2016, Nebraska Medicine assumed operations of Internal Medical Associates in Grand Island, Nebraska.

In January 2017, Nebraska Medicine announced that it would open Chalco Health Center in Chalco, as a primary care clinic and its fourth immediate care location, at which point it had around 40 clinic locations. That May, Nebraska Medicine opened the Fred & Pamela Buffett Cancer Center, a partly public partnership with various state and county investors. In September 2017, Nebraska Medicine closed its burn unit due to reduced patient volume. Opened in 1995, the unit had treated 100 burn patients annually. In August 2018, James Linder was appointed CEO. Nebraska Medicine and UNMC sent a team of infectious disease experts to Uganda in September 2018 to train local healthcare workers. At that time, Nebraska Medicine was also "working with several Nebraska hospitals to help implement electronic medical records." Nebraska Medicine had previously provided regional laboratory services to local hospitals, since 1998, also maintaining related records.

In 2018, the Nebraska Medicine network had 809 licensed beds. In 2018, Elkhorn Health Center, as well as a new building for Fontenelle Health Center, opened. Nebraska Medicine moved its Clarkson Family Medicine Clinic to a larger building in downtown Omaha, also performing the first bloodless stem cell transplant in the state. By 2019, some Nebraska Medicine hospital rooms featured virtual reality headsets to teach patients about procedures. Nebraska Medicine served as an organizer of the Flood Relief Donation Management Center that March, collecting donated items from corporations to help with relief efforts for flooding in Nebraska. Nebraska Medicine was awarded the "Nebraska's Safest Companies" award from the Nebraska chapter of the National Safety Council, in 2019. In June 2019, Nebraska Medicine was also named the best employer in Nebraska by Forbes. In December 2019, Nebraska Medicine announced it was planning a new facility to increase capacity for research and patient care, as well as "handle not only high-risk biological hazards like Ebola, but also chemical, radioactive, and environmental hazards." Dubbed the NExt project for "Nebraska Transformational Towers," the project will involve several towers on the northwest corner of the medical center campus, with a cost of between $1 and $2 billion.

=== 2020: COVID-19 pandemic response ===
During the early stages of the COVID-19 pandemic, in February 2020, Nebraska Medicine partnered with the federal government to evacuate Americans in Wuhan, China. 57 evacuees were quarantined in Camp Ashland, with Nebraska Medicine on standby to treat patients who developed symptoms. One patient was tested for a cough at the Nebraska Medical Center campus, but tested negative for COVID-19. Later that month, Nebraska Medicine was involved in training personnel and then testing and transporting American evacuees from the Diamond Princess cruise ship in Japan. With 14 evacuees testing positive, mildly ill patients were placed in the National Quarantine Unit (NQU) and sicker patients placed in the Nebraska Biocontainment Unit (NBU), both on Nebraska Medicine's medical campus, each with specialized facilities and advanced protocols.

By February 20, 11 of the 13 evacuees treated by Nebraska Medicine were confirmed to have COVID-19, with 10 people in the quarantine unit and 3 in the biocontainment unit. Performing a study in both units, Nebraska Medicine found high levels of the virus on surfaces and in the air of rooms of COVID-19 patients, providing "evidence that the disease might spread by both direct contact, as well as indirect contact, such as touching a contaminated object, or contracting the virus through airborne transmission" as an aerosol.

It was announced on March 7, 2020, that Nebraska Medicine's Biocontainment Unit was treating the first travel-related COVID-19 patient in Nebraska, a woman who had returned from England to Douglas County. On March 12, 2020, all Nebraska Medicine-related travel for faculty, providers, and students was suspended immediately to "slow the progression of COVID-19 in our community and protect our patients, families and each other from infection with COVID-19," with the policy to be reassessed every one to two months. Several days later Nebraska Medicine began rescheduling non-urgent procedures due to the pandemic, and on March 26, Nebraska Medicine announced it was restricting visitors at its hospitals and clinics. Also that month, Nebraska Medicine developed, tested, and implemented protocols for decontaminating and re-using N95 respirator masks with UV light, sharing the protocol with other hospitals seeking to conserve masks during a shortage of personal protective equipment.

After UNMC developed a plastic shield that could be placed around patients being intubated to protect physicians from COVID-19 in April 2020, the boxes were put in Nebraska Medical Center's ICU and operating rooms, and also donated to other medical systems. The Nebraska Medical Center in April 2020 also began using the Infectious Aerosol Capture Mask, which was developed by UNMC to contain particles released by patients in operating and recovery rooms. In April 2020, Nebraska Medicine also set up a COVID-19 hotline and medical tents outside Nebraska Medical Center to screen patients for COVID-19, with the nearby emergency room also setting up a designated area for patients with critical COVID-19 issues. By that time, Nebraska Medicine and UNMC were collaborating on playbooks to "provide best practices and recommendations for meat processing facilities to minimize the risk that COVID-19," sending experts to tour meatpacking plants and provide technical assistance. They also created playbooks for school and teachers. In April 2020, Nebraska Medicine began leading the first clinical trial of remdesivir, a potential treatment for COVID-19, with clinical trial patients housed in Nebraska Medicine's biocontainment unit. After early phases of the trial showed success, Nebraska Medicine opened a third phase in August 2020.

=== 2022–present: Project Health and merger ===
In the years following the pandemic, several building projects were completed, with others under construction, including the Community Wellness Collaborative, in 2023; and the Innovation Design Unit on the Nebraska Medical Center campus, in 2024; and the Nebraska Medicine–Bennington Health Center, expected to open in late 2025.

In August 2024, in partnership with UNMC, Project Health was announced. The facility would be 400 feet (120 m) tall and would be used by both UNMC and Nebraska Medicine. In December 2024, Nebraska Medicine opened the Fred & Pamela Buffett Cancer Center – Kearney, a new development that houses the former Heartland Hematology Oncology practice which joined Nebraska Medicine in 2021.

In January 2025, Nebraska Medicine opened the Innovation Design Unit on the 6th floor of University Tower. Focused on new technologies for hospital care; it combines inpatient care, research, and education, along with a development space to foster newer approaches. In June 2025, Nebraska Medicine announced it would be developing a healthcare center as a part of the Gretna Landing development in Gretna, Nebraska.

In January 2026, UNMC regents announced a vote that would result in Clarkson Regional Health Services, an affiliate of Clarkson College, relinquishing its 50% membership in Nebraska Medicine. The move was claimed to have been caused by Clarkson wanting to divest from Nebraska Medicine. Additionally, Clarkson would sell its campus to the University of Nebraska Medical Center for $300 million. Nebraska Medicine publicly responded against the merger, claiming that they would not let it happen.

On January 8, 2026, university regents postponed the vote following pressure from members of the Nebraska State Legislature. The University of Nebraska board of regents voted on January 15 to approve the acquisition of Clarkson's membership. The merger will be completed by July 2026. To prevent UNMC from taking full control of Nebraska Medicine, the board filed a lawsuit against UNMC that same day. On February 2, 2026, UNMC regents fired the board opposed to the merger and replaced them with an interim board. Under the new leadership, Nebraska Medicine dropped the lawsuit.

== Operations and staff ==
Nebraska Medicine's primary care clinics use a "patient-centered medical home model of care," which involves giving patients a "team" of healthcare providers, including "primary care doctors, pharmacists, nutritionists, behavioral health professionals and other providers", such as social workers and dietitians. Primarily serving the metro Omaha area and several counties in Iowa, during its 2024 fiscal year, it had 31,147 discharges, 842,310 in-person primary and specialty patient visits, 91,269 telehealth visits, and 97,800 emergency department visits.

Nebraska Medicine operates emergency departments out of its two major hospitals in Omaha and Bellevue. Nebraska Medicine's main campus, Nebraska Medical Center, is located in midtown Omaha and anchored by several multi-story buildings and facilities. Additional facilities include over 70 outpatient clinics serving 809 licensed beds.

=== Board ===
Nebraska Medicine is governed by a central board. The central board is made up of the University of Nebraska Medical Center and Clarkson Regional Health Services. Both UNMC and Clarkson were owners of the previous hospitals prior to the formation of Nebraska Medicine. Additionally, both UNMC and Clarkson both have a 50% presence in the board. Buildings on Nebraska Medicine's primary campus are owned by UNMC and Clarkson Regional Health Services.

=== Certifications and programs ===
In 2024, U.S. News & World Report ranked Nebraska Medicine as the best regional hospital in Nebraska. Its oncology and gastroenterology and G.I. surgery programs ranked in the top 50 nationwide, and the treatment of cancer, gastroenterology, neurology, neurosurgery, COPD, colon cancer surgery, heart bypass surgery, heart failure treatment, and hip replacement. The company has full ownership of two hospitals and 70 specialty and primary care clinics in and around Omaha. Nebraska Medicine's main campus, Nebraska Medical Center, has 718 beds, while its Bellevue Medical Center campus has 91 beds. The company operates the largest of only four dedicated biocontainment units in the United States, and is particularly recognized for programs in fields such as organ transplantation cancer treatment, gastroenterology, neurology, neurosurgery, COPD, heart bypass surgery, heart failure treatment, and hip replacement. Nebraska Medical Center was ranked the No. 1 hospital in Nebraska and in Omaha by U.S. News & World Report in 2024, for the 13th straight year.

Nebraska Medicine is known internationally for bone marrow and organ transplantation. Nebraska Medicine's stroke program, heart failure program and acute myocardial infarction program received the "Gold Seal of Approval" certification from The Joint Commission in 2017. The Joint Commission also certified the company in inpatient diabetes and lung transplantation in 2017, and the Comprehensive Epilepsy Center at Nebraska Medicine was certified as a level 4 epilepsy center by the National Association of Epilepsy Centers, the highest rating.

== Facilities ==
Nebraska Medicine operates two hospitals and 70 specialty and primary care clinics. It also operates five immediate-care clinics in Omaha and surrounding cities: Chalco Health Center; Eagle Run Health Center; Family Medicine at Bellevue Clinic; and Midtown Health Center. and Fontenelle Health Center. Nebraska Medicine's main hospital, the Nebraska Medical Center, is shared with the University of Nebraska Medical Center and is located on UNMC's campus. Nebraska Medicine additionally operates another hospital in Bellevue known as Bellevue Medical Center.

== See also ==
- Hospitals in Omaha, Nebraska
- History of Omaha, Nebraska
