= Adoption of electronic medical records in U.S. hospitals =

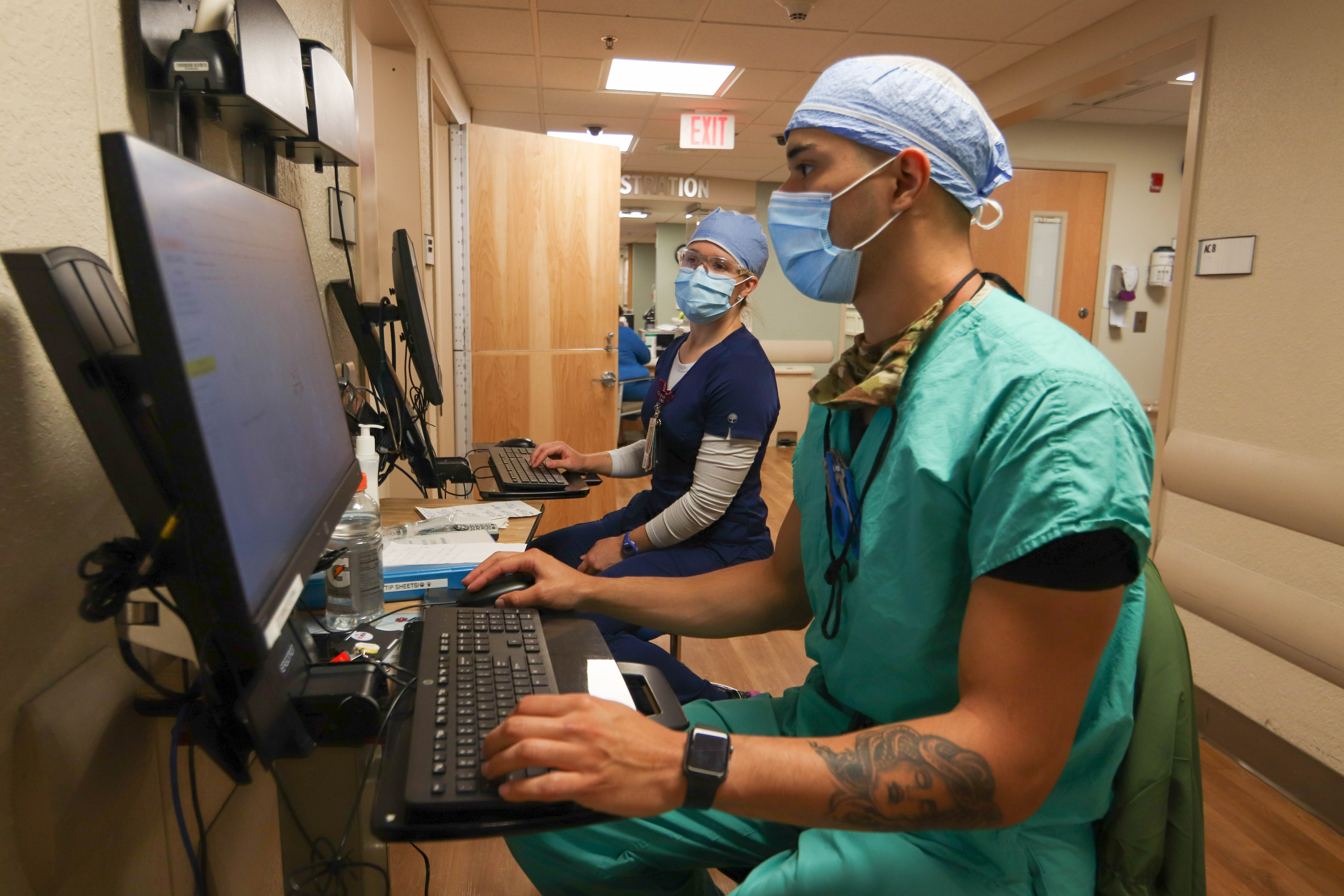
Combat medic Loran Jones updating patient medical records on an EHR system

The adoption of electronic medical records refers to the recent shift from paper-based medical records to electronic health records (EHRs) in hospitals. The move to electronic medical records is becoming increasingly prevalent in health care delivery systems in the United States, with more than 80% of hospitals adopting some form of EHR system by November 2017.

The adoption of electronic medical records is widely viewed as a success by healthcare professionals, reducing the risk of medical errors and increasing statistics of patient satisfaction.

== Methods ==
Due to the enactment of the American Recovery and Reinvestment Act of 2009, there has been a rise in the number of federal investments in programs that increase EMR adoption. The Health Information Technology for Economic and Clinical Health Act portion of this stimulus law provides payments for providers that show they have reached the standard for “meaningful use”. This has led more hospitals to adopt EMR, though they have had different experiences in adopting electronic medical records.

There are several steps that need to be taken in order to adopt electronic medical records.

1. A supportive environment, adequate training and resources, a clear direction, and engaged people are a few things needed.
2. A strong leader is also necessary in order to facilitate the changing environment and using meetings and announcements as adoption promotion tactics have been shown to be useful.
3. Having the clinical staff involved is also a key feature in successfully adopting electronic medical records. Many hospitals use “physician champions,” who are essentially physicians who educate their peers on the benefits of electronic medical records.
4. Furthermore, the importance of quality department leaders has been stressed in order to make sure the electronic medical records system is beneficial in providing quality care.

Hospitals have been using different suppliers of health data systems in order to adopt electronic medical records. The key suppliers of health data systems are Epic Systems, Allscripts, Meditech, Cerner, IBM, McKesson, Siemens, Healthland, CPSI, and GE Healthcare.

The decision of choosing an EMR vendor like Epic or Meditech can fall on either hospital leadership or the corporate level based on the size of the system. If an organization only has one hospital, the hospital leaders select the vendor. If the system is larger, the decision is made at the corporate level, though several people from the hospitals remain involved. There are several criteria for deciding the vendor. Sentara Healthcare was able to make their selection by looking for a vendor with high outpatient care integration, technical support at all levels of integration, and one that customized a system to their needs.

The length of time it takes to implement electronic medical records can vary but usually takes two to three years. The first stage of implementation is called “design, build, validate,” where the vendor is selected and the plans are put in place. This is followed by a “big bang” implementation, which means all the departments transfer to the system at once, due to the interconnectedness of hospitals this is necessary.

Though the adoption of electronic medical records is increasing, there is a range in the level of implementation. The HIMSS Analytics Database shows the eight stages of adoption in their United States EMR Adoption Model. Stage 0 implies “All three ancillaries not installed,” while in Stage 7 there is a shift to complete EMR. The EMR Adoption Model shows that in 2011, the number of acute care hospitals achieving Stage 5 or Stage 6 increased by more than 80 percent. Meanwhile, the number of hospitals at Stages 0, 1, 2, and 3 has decreased. Furthermore, adoption has increased most among large hospitals and those in urban areas.

== Implementation ==
EMR implementation experiences among hospitals and healthcare delivery systems vary. Some systems have successful experiences, while others do not have as seamless of a transition. For example, in 2002, Cedars-Sinai Medical Center in Los Angeles, CA attempted to implement a new EMR system, but the US$34 million system failed due to numerous factors. The physicians were unhappy because of the new physician order entry system for medications, labs and procedures was more time-consuming than doing the orders by hand. Physicians often found themselves spending extra time to avoid the system's warnings because there was not room for flexibility within the EMR system. Not only was the new system more time-consuming, but it also alerted physicians with numerous electronic reminders and alerts that the physicians felt were excessive. The system was implemented with numerous decision support mechanisms, which created alerts that could not be overridden by physicians. This flaw was a result of not obtaining adequate physician input for the EMR system and not enough prior testing. These problems then made it very difficult to obtain buy-in from the physicians, which ultimately caused several hundred physicians employed at Cedars to refuse to use the system after only 3 months.

The failure was not only due to technology design and inefficiencies, but also to poor training and implementation. The hospital had implemented the system with very little prior testing, and did not gradually phase in the system but rather implemented it all at once. There was also not full buy-in from the staff at all levels of the organization, and insufficient training to ensure that the staff was ready for implementation. The example of failed EMR implementation at Cedars shows the complexities that health systems face in EMR implementation. However, there are numerous positive EMR experiences as well.

Both Geisinger Health System and New York-Presbyterian Hospital have been cited as having successful implementations of EMR systems. Both of these systems utilized key strategies that ultimately led to successful implementation. To create success, both Geisinger and NY Presbyterian utilized clinical teams to develop the EMR system, and therefore gained staff and physician buy-in. Another strategy used to reach successful implementation is for the organization to focus on training. At Geisinger, for example, the hospital provided “shadowers” for physicians and nurses throughout the day during the implementation phase. Then, as physicians and nurses gradually become proficient with the new system, the number of trainers needed gradually decreased. Both hospitals also clearly emphasized that training was mandatory for all staff and that all staff must pass a proficiency test before they can access the EMR system. Another strategy for successful EMR implementation used by these two hospitals is to use the EMR system for performance improvement through standardized care protocols. To successfully do this, NY Presbyterian gradually utilized more hard stops within their protocols over time to ensure that protocols were being followed. However, these hard stops were created collaboratively to achieve physician buy-in and ensure that they were appropriate for care delivery. Allowing tailoring of the EMR system is essential to both before implementation and afterwards, and physicians and clinical staff must be used in this development process to create success.

== Results ==
Currently, there has been little research and evaluation on the post-implementation of commercial electronic medical records (EMR). MetroHealth Medical Center in Cleveland, OH, has published an evaluation of the EpicCare EMR by Epic Systems five years after implementation. MetroHealth's methods included a web-based survey for primary care providers to measure their level of utilization of the EpicCare EMR. The physicians surveyed were those in the internal medicine, family medicine, and the pediatric units of the hospital. Prior to the survey, physicians were given eight hours of training by consultants on how to navigate the EMR system. The survey subsequently taken showed a response rate of 35% or 59 of 154 providers. Questions included whether providers have a computer at home, whether they access EpicCare from home, and their level of expertise on using a computer. The results showed that 97% had a computer at home, while 53% accessed EpicCare from home, and 11% were computer novice, 76% intermediate, and 13% were advance users. Using a scale of 1 to 4, 87% of providers surveyed rated the EpicCare system as either good or excellent.

The survey showed that in terms of the overall level of satisfaction with the EMR, 6% of respondents felt that EpicCare was inferior to a paper-based system, 81% felt that it was superior, while 13% were indifferent. In the area of training, 46% of respondents felt that their training was inadequate, and 75% would like to receive additional training. The implementation of the EpicCare EMR has impacted the way physicians treated their patients as evidenced by 12% of respondents reporting that they had changed medications based on the medication alerts and 15% reporting that they followed the EMR's best practices alerts. The survey results revealed several areas that can benefit from improvement, such as ongoing training and support as well as the optimal utilization of all EMR functions.

JKL Healthcare System, a nonprofit organization that employs a 450-employee physician group and operates three acute care hospitals, implemented an EMR system in 2001. The cost of "Epic", the new system, was $35 million. Their goal is for every physician in their organization to adapt the EMR at a 100% utilization rate in order to increase efficiency and reduce adverse patient outcomes. 450 physicians were required to attend a 16-hour training session in order to obtain a certification that would allow them to admit patients. 1,700 Non-physician employees were required to attend the same training to receive their certification as well.

A physician survey was conducted two months after implementation which showed that out of 73 respondents, 90% of physicians felt that the Epic system made their jobs easier and more efficient. Admissions for the hospitals have risen since implementation as well as physician support, which indicated that the EMR has been implemented successfully. During the May – August 2004 period of post implementation, outpatient visits increased by 3%, medication errors were eliminated completely, and patient satisfaction surveys showed that overall satisfaction increased to their highest level since 2000. EMR utilization has saved JKL Healthcare approximately $50,000 on office supplies and has significantly reduced the number of medical records staff.

The JKL Healthcare System was one of the first successful implementers of EMR using the Epic System, and they became a model site for other healthcare systems. JKL Healthcare received the Davies Award in September 2004, which is the most prestigious award in the IT industry for its implementation of the most comprehensive EMR system in the US.
