= Camp Ashland =

Army National Guard facility

Coordinates: 41°04′07″N 96°20′05″W

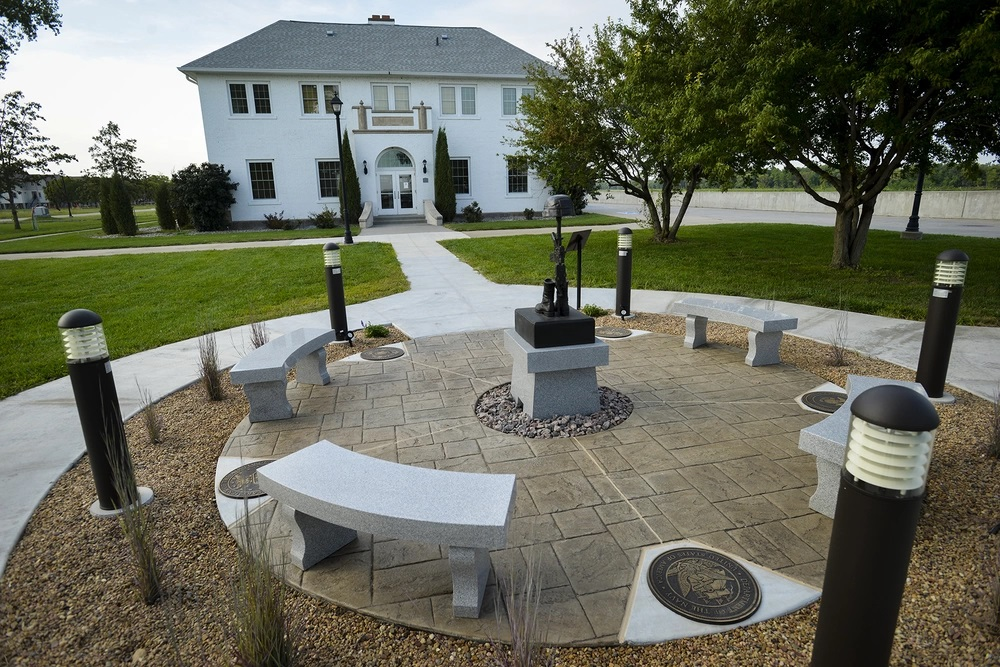
Fallen Heroes Memorial at Camp Ashland

Camp Ashland, Nebraska is an Army National Guard facility located near Ashland, Nebraska, United States, along the Platte River. The camp has been in use by the Nebraska National Guard for more than 100 years. The camp is currently home to the 209th Regimental Training Institute. Year-round training is conducted at Camp Ashland, and it is considered one of the midwest's most important military training centers, with 80,000 to 100,000 service members training at the camp every year. Each weekend can see anywhere from 300 to 1,000 troops at the camp, above and beyond the service members attending schools there.

== Early history ==
The land that now comprises the camp was first used for military activities in 1906 after the Spanish–American War. It was used as a rifle range, in order for Nebraska soldiers to improve their marksmanship through target practice. At the time, the owner of the land rented part of her farm to the state of Nebraska for $994.05. The state constructed ranges and conducted "encampments" (now known as annual training) at the site and renewed the lease option. The federal government purchased the land on behalf of the state in 1916.

When Nebraska National Guard troops returned home from World War I in 1919, the camp had fallen into disrepair. Repairs were conducted using Federal funds, and in 1923, annual training once again occurred at Camp Ashland. During this time frame, the camp developed rapidly. An administration building was constructed, along with a wooden boxing ring. In 1930, Memorial Hall was dedicated, and served as the camp's primary administration building for decades (currently known as Building 50). During the 1930s the boxing ring was rebuilt by the Works Progress Administration (WPA) into a concrete arena with a 3,000 person capacity. Eventually, the firing-range operations were moved to a location 130 miles southwest, currently known as Greenlief Training Site, near Hastings, Nebraska.

== Current use ==
The camp is home to the 209th Regimental Training Institute (RTI), which consists of Headquarters (HQ), 209th RTI, 1/209th RTI (NCO Academy), 2/209th RTI (OCS/WOCS), 3/209th RTI (88M), and Camp Ashland Training Site Command (CATS). Access to the camp is restricted, and only authorized personnel and those with United States Department of Defense (DOD) identification are allowed to enter. Camp Ashland has remained a primary training site for the Nebraska National Guard throughout its history, and has also been used by other branches of the active United States military, other state National Guard units, and for military joint force training exercises with units from other countries. The camp has been used by many other groups, such as the Civil Air Patrol, JROTC, and Boy Scouts.

=== HQ 209th RTI ===
Headquarters (HQ) 209th RTI's mission is to provide leadership and support for the subordinate battalions of the 209th RTI, and also for the Camp Ashland Training Site Command (CATS).

=== 1/209th RTI ===
1st Battalion's mission as an NCO Academy is to facilitate soldiers' training needs by providing tactical and technical training. The current primary course for 1st BN is the Basic Leader Course (BLC), which is taught at the 209th RTI to active duty U.S. Army Soldiers, Army National Guard Soldiers, and Army Reserve Soldiers. The course is currently a 22-day course. Unlike the active component, the course is taught straight through with no days off. Training focuses on leadership and war-fighting techniques, to prepare junior non-commissioned officers (NCO) for duty. The BLC course was formerly known as Warrior Leader Course (WLC), and prior to that was called Primary Leadership Development Course (PLDC).

=== 2/209th RTI ===
2nd Battalion's mission is to conduct the Officer Candidate School (OCS) and Warrant officer (United States) Candidate School (WOCS). The course teaches a variety of leadership skills and small-unit tactics. Traditional training takes place on the weekend for 16–18 months, plus two two-week periods. Accelerated training is an 8-week course. Students are referred to as "Candidates" during their training, and must successfully complete a rigorous training regimen to test them both physically and mentally, in order to receive a formal commission. OCS and WOCS graduates go on to become leaders as officers in the United States military.

=== 3/209th RTI ===
3rd Battalion's mission is the operation of the Medium Transportation Military Occupational Specialty (88M United States military occupation code (MOS)) course as set forth by the U.S. Army Transportation Corps at Fort Gregg-Adams, Virginia. This course is provided to members of the Army National Guard and Army Reserve who are reclassifying to the 88M MOS. The 88M course consists of two phases, each two weeks in length, and generally taught consecutively for 28 days. During Phase I, students are taught to operate of M1083 Family of Medium Tactical Vehicles (FMTV) five-ton trucks, and M915 tractor trucks with M872 trailers. During Phase II, the students are taught to operate the M1120 HEMTT Load Handling System (LHS) trucks, along with the M1076 PLS trailer. The 88M MOS course has been taught at Camp Ashland since 2008.

=== CATS ===
Camp Ashland Training Site Command (CATS) covers both Camp Ashland and Greenlief Training site, provides lodging and logistical support for both sites, along with facilitating scheduling for training events at the two sites. CATS also facilitates semi-private, cabin, recreational-vehicle, and campground lodging for current and former military and DOD members.

== 2019 flooding ==
Camp Ashland is located on a flood plain by virtue of its proximity to the Platte River. Due to previous flood issues, the military has steadily increased the camp's flood protection over the years, from a five foot high protective berm/levee, to 3 foot high flood-control barrier doors following a 2015 flood that caused $3.7 million in damage. In March 2019, however, historic flooding ravaged Camp Ashland, causing unprecedented damage. On March 14, 2019, the Salt Creek (Platte River) flooded from the southeast side of the camp, sweeping through with mud and debris. Salt Creek itself crested at 22.11 feet depth. Then, two days later, the Platte River itself broke through the protective levee on the east and northeast side, bringing an even larger flood of water along with debris, sand, and mud across the camp. In all, 51 of the 62 buildings in the camp were heavily damaged or destroyed. It was the worst disaster in the camp's 100-year history, with water cresting along the camp anywhere from 5 to 7 feet (well above the flood-control doors), forcing extensive repairs to nearly every area of the camp. Any scheduled training that could still be conducted was moved to alternate locations, with many training events being cancelled. The only buildings on camp to escape significant damage were those built on stilts in 1997. Currently, Nebraska military representatives would like to expand that plan to so that any replacement buildings would also be raised on stilts.

== 2020 coronavirus quarantine ==
In late January, 2020, during the SARS-CoV-2 outbreak in Wuhan, China, the Chinese government halted nearly all transit to and from the city. The United States government began arranging for American diplomats and citizens to be evacuated from the area through the use of charter flights. Starting on February 5, 2020, more than 350 Americans were flown to the United States where they would begin a two-week quarantine protocol to ensure they were not infected. The first 195 Americans to arrive from Wuhan were housed at Travis Air Force Base in Fairfield, California. Other American evacuees were flown to Marine Corps Air Station Miramar in San Diego, California. Camp Ashland was selected as one of the quarantine sites by the Centers for Disease Control (CDC) due to the close proximity of the University of Nebraska Medical Center National Quarantine Center and Nebraska Biocontainment Unit (NBU). The NBU first gained international attention for the care of patients during the 2014 Ebola outbreak.

57 Americans arrived from Wuhan at Eppley Airfield, Omaha, Nebraska on February 7, 2020. Many had been traveling for more than 40 hours, with multiple medical screenings. These passengers were examined by medical staff upon arrival, found to be free of symptoms, and were taken to Camp Ashland at around 10 p.m. that evening to begin their two-week quarantine. During their stay, they were screened twice a day for symptoms. Medical officials working with evacuees at Camp Ashland wore protective gear during the screenings. A building was made available with exercise equipment, and residents were given cell phones for communication. Local and federal officials emphasized that the quarantine was precautionary, and that the 57 persons staying at Camp Ashland were not sick, and had exhibited no symptoms. The quarantined residents were housed separately and had no interaction with Soldiers and employees at Camp Ashland, who continued day-to-day operations at the camp. One female was taken to UNMC as a precaution after developing a cough, but was cleared after testing for the virus came up negative. On February 20, 2020, the end of the 14 day quarantine, none of the 57 quarantined persons had developed the virus, and all were allowed to leave Camp Ashland.
