= University of Nebraska Medical Center =

Public medical school in Omaha, Nebraska, US

Coordinates: 41°15′21.71″N 95°58′32.81″W

- Type: Public academic health science center
- Established: 1869 (charted in 1881)
- Parent institution: University of Nebraska system
- Affiliations: Nebraska Medicine
- Academic affiliations: Space-grant
- Endowment: $1.072 billion budget, 2026-27, 16.7% state supported
- Chancellor: H. Dele Davies
- President: Jeffrey P. Gold
- Vice-Chancellor: Jane Meza (interim)
- Administrative staff: 6,536; 5,624 FTE(2026)
- Students: 4,847 (2026)
- Location: Omaha, Nebraska, United States
- Colors: Red and white
- Mascot: Labs
- Website: www.unmc.edu

The University of Nebraska Medical Center (UNMC) is a public academic health science center in Omaha, Nebraska, United States. Founded in 1869 and chartered as a private medical college in 1881, UNMC became part of the University of Nebraska in 1902. Rapidly expanding in the early 20th century, the university founded a hospital, dental college, pharmacy college, college of nursing, and college of medicine. It later added colleges of public health and allied health professions. One of Omaha's top employers, UNMC's annual budget for fiscal year 2026 is $1.072 billion, of which 16.7% is state supported, and an economic impact of $5.9 billion.

== History ==
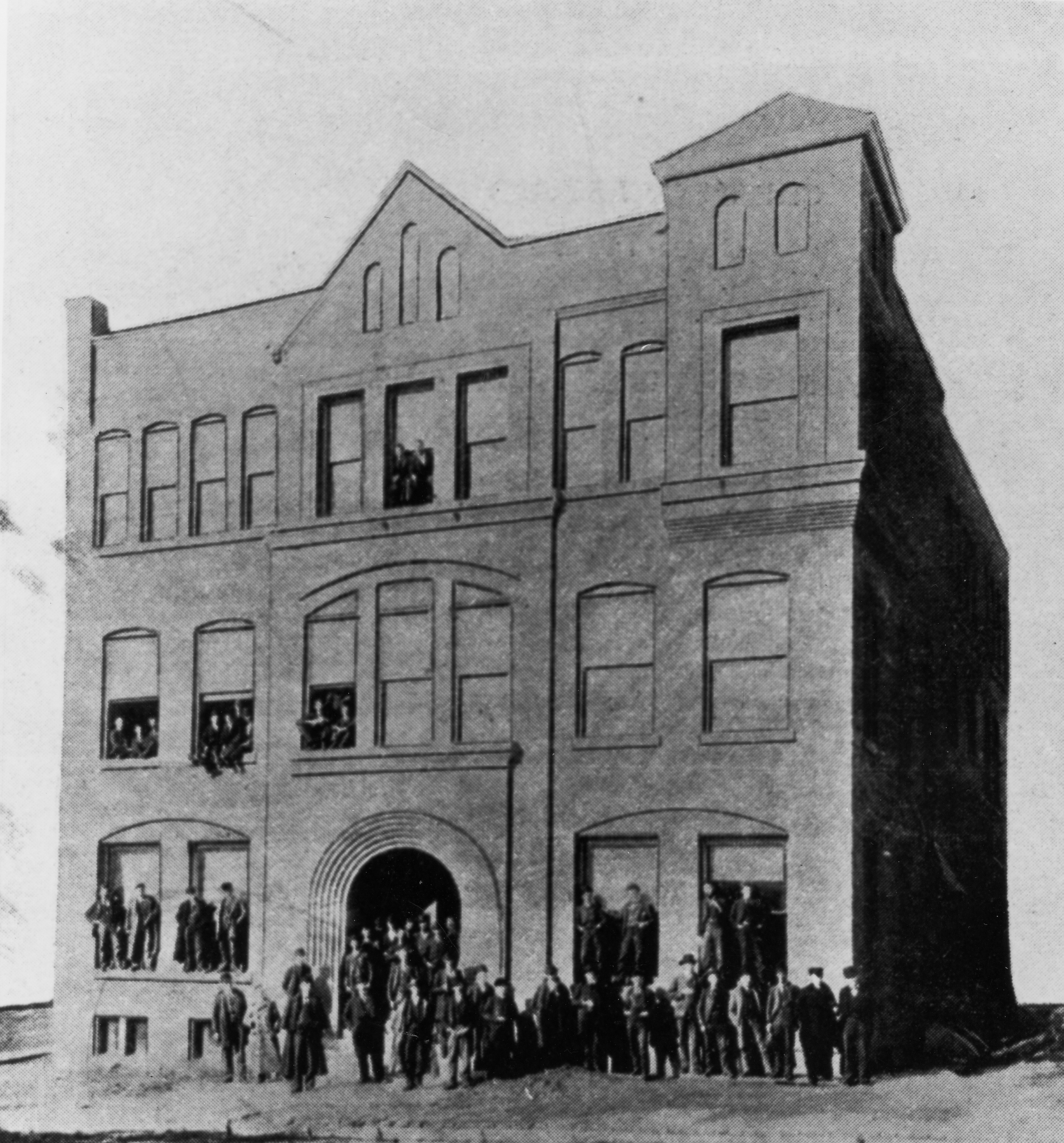
The original Omaha Medical College building at 12th & Pacific in 1900

The University of Nebraska Medical Center was formed in 1869 as the Omaha Medical College. The college was organized as a training school by several Nebraskan physicians and was originally private. The college was officially chartered in 1881. Omaha Medical College officially joined the University of Nebraska in 1902. Under the University of Nebraska, the college grew, adding a dental college in 1903, a pharmacy college in 1908, and a nursing college in 1917. That same year, the college formed a hospital on campus, which later opened in 1919.

In 1968, medicine, nursing, dentistry and pharmacy operations were all consolidated by the system to form the University of Nebraska Medical Center. That same year, the university separated from the University of Nebraska–Lincoln and officially joined the University of Nebraska system In 1997, the university hospital merged with Bishop Clarkson Memorial Hospital, then-affiliate of Clarkson College. The resulting entity was the Nebraska Health System, now known as Nebraska Medicine, to which the university is affiliated with. The following year, the university and hospital opened the 14-story Lied Transplant Center, which at 230 feet (70 m) tall, is the twelfth tallest building in Omaha.

=== Ebola epidemic response ===
During the 2014 Ebola epidemic, the federal government tapped Nebraska as one of three units prepared to accept highly infectious patients in the United States. Today, UNMC/Nebraska Medicine has the largest operational biocontainment unit in the nation.

UNMC's academic, local, state, and federal partnerships have expanded with the initiation of the National Ebola Training and Education Center (NETEC). the Special Pathogens Research Network (SPRN) and the National Training, Simulation & Quarantine Center. These organizations and additional alliances are housed under the Global Center for Health Security.

In 2016, UNMC was awarded a $19.8 million grant from the Office of the Assistant Secretary of Preparedness and Response in the U.S. Department of Health & Human Services. The four-year federal grant — which has renewable options for an additional 21 years — enables UNMC to teach federal health care personnel procedures in treating highly infectious diseases.

The University of Nebraska Medical Center created the Global Center for Health Security in 2017. The goal of the creation of the center is to transform and centralize "infectious disease response and biodefense research." Among the reasons behind the move were concerns about outbreaks of viruses, infectious diseases, and an environment where a biological terrorist attack is a possibility.

In 2016, a UNMC team of researchers was awarded a five-year research grant from the National Institutes of Health totaling nearly $20 million, through the Institutional Development Award (IDeA) program and the NIH's National Institute of General Medical Studies. The grant will focus on developing early career researchers into independent scientists and increasing the infrastructure and other resources needed to support clinical/translational research (CTR) around the region. The grant will create the Great Plains IDeA-CTR Network, a collaboration involving nine institutions in four states: Nebraska, North Dakota, South Dakota and Kansas

=== SARS-CoV-2 epidemic response ===
In 2020, UNMC and Nebraska Medicine were enlisted to support a federal operation that evacuated 57 Americans from Wuhan, China, during an epidemic of novel coronavirus, SARS CoV-2. The group was placed in quarantine at Camp Ashland, a Nebraska National Guard facility near Omaha. Thirteen Americans were repatriated to University of Nebraska Medical Center on February 17, from the Diamond Princess off the coast of Japan. Ten had tested positive, and three others had been exposed. Three days later, eleven of these people tested positive. UNMC scientists, working with evidence gathered in the National Quarantine Center, in the new $119 million Dr. Edwin G. & Dorothy Balbach Davis Global Center on UNMC's Omaha campus, found the SARS-CoV-2 virus spreads through airborne transmission.

UNMC led the first clinical trial in the U.S. on the use of remdesivir to treat patients hospitalized with COVID-19. UNMC developed a series of guides to help meatpacking facilities, child development centers, court systems, K-12 education and higher education minimize the risk of COVID-19 and reduce disruptions to business operations. UNMC scientists developed a safe and effective method to decontaminate N95 respirators using ultraviolet light. The process, shared with hospital systems across the U.S., allowed multiple reuse of N95s when personal protective equipment was in short supply.

=== 2020–present ===
In August 2024, the University of Nebraska Medical Center and Nebraska Medicine announced Project Health. The facility will be 400 feet (120 m) tall and will be used by both UNMC and Nebraska Medicine.

In June 2026, the Higher Learning Commission and the U.S. Department of Education formally recognized joint institutional accreditation for the University of Nebraska Medical Center and the University of Nebraska–Lincoln. The joint accreditation creates an administrative framework under which the two universities will report key data jointly. Both UNMC and UNL will retain distinct identities, academic offerings, separate student governance, faculty senates and completely independent budgets.

In September 2026, the University of Nebraska Board of Regents approved shared governance of Nebraska Medicine with the Omaha Community Foundation, with a $300 million contribution. The foundation replaces Clarkson Regional Health Services after its decision to divest from Nebraska Medicine.

In 2026, UNMC's College of Medicine moved up to Tier 1 out of four in primary training and retained its Tier 2 ranking in research, according to U.S. News & World Report. Other programs that also received a national ranking include graduates practicing in rural health care (17th); the College of Pharmacy (16th of 141); the College of Nursing Doctor of Nursing Practice program (68th); the College of Public Health (49th), and the College of Allied Health Professions' physical therapy program (31) and physician assistant program (14th).

=== Colleges and degree-granting institutes ===
The University of Nebraska Medical Center includes six colleges, a graduate studies program, two degree-granting institutes and a major research institute: The colleges of Medicine, Dentistry, Nursing, Pharmacy, Public Health and Allied Health Professions; the Eppley Institute for Cancer Research and Allied Diseases and the Munroe-Meyer Institute for Developmental Disabilities; and the Child Health Research Institute. A majority of these colleges are located on UNMC's Midtown campus. The College of Dentistry is located on the east campus of the University of Nebraska–Lincoln in Lincoln, Nebraska. The College of Nursing has five locations: UNMC's Omaha campus, on UNL's Lincoln campus, on the University of Nebraska at Kearney in Kearney, Nebraska. Scottsbluff, Nebraska. and Norfolk, Nebraska. The College of Allied Health Professions also offers programs on the UNK campus.

== Campus ==
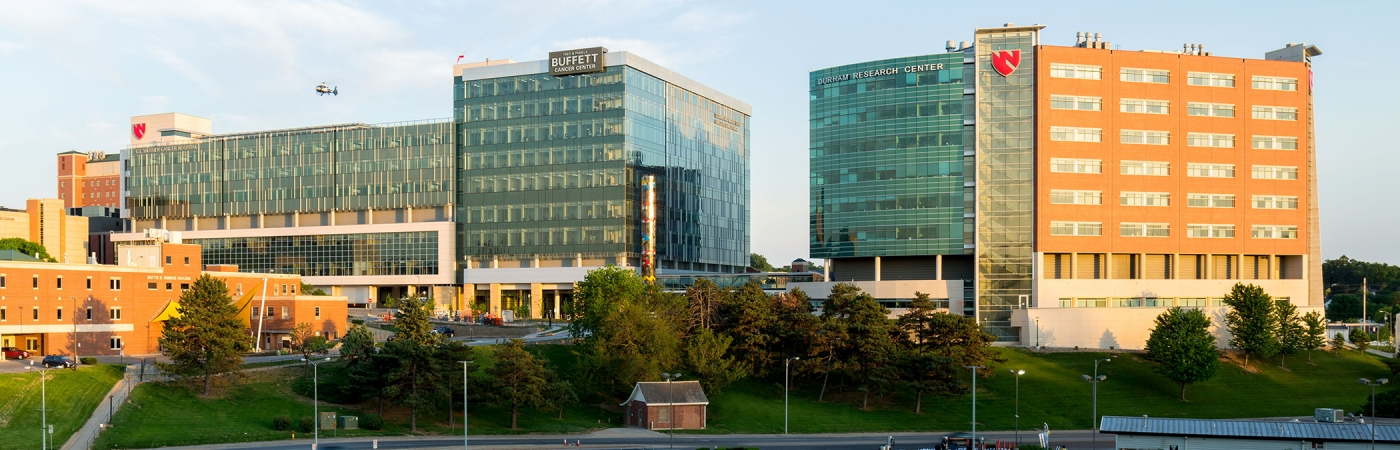
The Fred & Pamela Buffett Cancer Center and Duham Research Center I in 2019

The University of Nebraska Medical Center's primary campus is located in Midtown Omaha, Nebraska, United States. The campus is shared with Nebraska Medicine. Major buildings on campus include the Lied Transplant Center, Fred & Pamela Buffett Cancer Center, Clarkson Tower, Dunham Research Towers I & II, and the under-construction Project Health.

== Notable alumni ==
- Stephen Gilson, theorist and policy analyst known for work in disability, diversity, and health policy
- Bob Kerrey, former Nebraska governor, former U.S. senator from Nebraska, Medal of Honor recipient for service in the Vietnam War as a Navy Seal
- James Linder, author, academic, business leader, and authority on university research commercialization
- Rod Markin, pioneer and leading authority in the field of laboratory automation who designed one of the world's first automated clinical laboratory specimen, device and analyzer management systems
- John Nwangwu, public health doctor with expertise in infectious diseases and epidemiology, and consultant at the World Health Organization
- Richard Allen Raymond, Under Secretary of Agriculture for Food Safety 2005–2009
- Steven M. Reppert, neuroscientist known for his contributions to the fields of chronobiology and neuroethology
- Matthew Ricketts, first African-American graduate of UNMC College of Medicine and first African-American member of the Nebraska Legislature
- Edward Rosenbaum, author of The Doctor, an autobiographical chronicle of his experience with throat cancer, which was the basis of the movie The Doctor, starring William Hurt as a physician modeled on Rosenbaum
- Nancy Snyderman, physician, author, and former broadcast journalist who served as a medical correspondent for ABC News and as chief medical editor for NBC News
- Francis Townsend, physician best known for his revolving old-age pension proposal during the Great Depression, which influenced the establishment of the Roosevelt administration's Social Security system
- Charles Vacanti, researcher in tissue engineering and stem cells
- Rob Zatechka, former football offensive lineman in the National Football League who went to medical school after his NFL career ended

== See also ==
- Eppley Institute for Research in Cancer and Allied Diseases
