= Douglas Kell =

British biochemist

Douglas Kell CBE FRSB FLSW
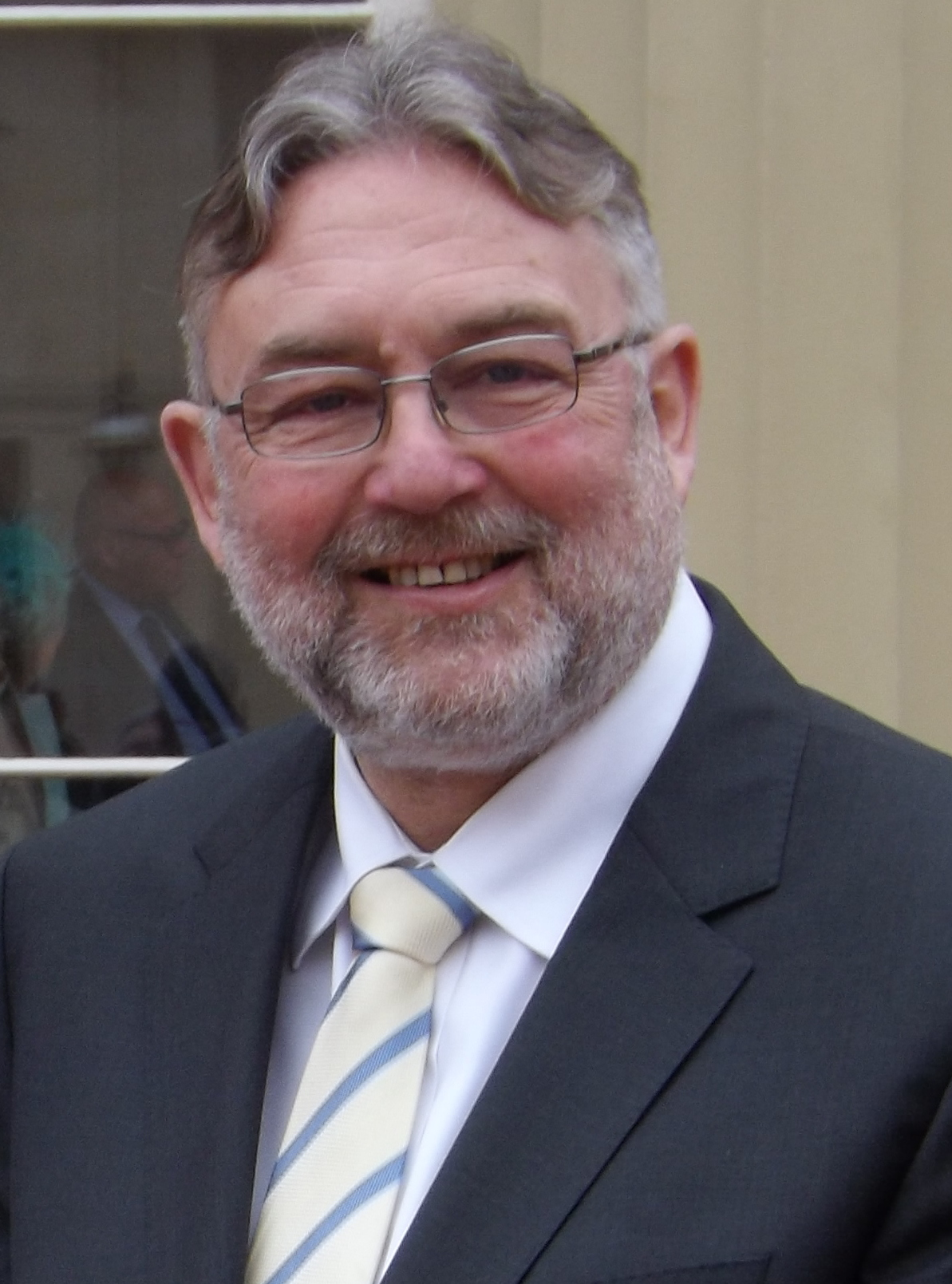
- Douglas Kell in 2014
- Born: Douglas Bruce Kell; 7 April 1953 (age 73)
- Education: Bradfield College; University of Oxford (BA, DPhil)
- Known for: CEO of BBSRC
- Spouse: Antje Wagner (m. 1989)
- Children: 3
- Scientific career
- Fields: Systems biology; Computational biology
- Workplaces: Biotechnology and Biological Sciences Research Council; University of Liverpool; University of Manchester Institute of Science and Technology; University of Manchester; Aberystwyth University; University of Oxford
- Thesis: The Bioenergetics of Paracoccus denitrificans (1978)
- Doctoral advisor: Stuart Ferguson; Philip John
- Doctoral students: Pedro Mendes
- Website: dbkgroup.org

Douglas Bruce Kell CBE FRSB FLSW (born 7 April 1953) is a British biochemist and Professor of Systems Biology in the Department of Biochemistry, Cell and Systems Biology, University of Liverpool part of the Institute of Systems, Molecular and Integrative Biology at the University of Liverpool. He was previously at the School of Chemistry at the University of Manchester, based in the Manchester Institute of Biotechnology (MIB) where he founded and led the Manchester Centre for Integrative Systems Biology (MCISB). He was chief executive officer (CEO) of the Biotechnology and Biological Sciences Research Council (BBSRC) from 2008 to 2013.

== Education and early life ==
Kell was privately educated at Hydneye House in Sussex and Bradfield College in Berkshire where he was top scholar. He graduated from the University of Oxford with a bachelor's degree in biochemistry in 1975 with a distinction in chemical pharmacology, where he was an undergraduate student of St John's College, Oxford. He stayed in Oxford for his PhD, completed in 1978 with a thesis on the bioenergetics of the microbe Paracoccus denitrificans, supervised by Stuart Ferguson and Philip John.

== Research and career ==
From 1978 to 2002 he worked at Aberystwyth University, moving to the University of Manchester Institute of Science and Technology (UMIST) in 2002 as an Engineering and Physical Sciences Research Council (EPSRC) / Royal Society of Chemistry (RSC) Research Chair in Bioanalytical Sciences. (UMIST merged with the Victoria University of Manchester in 2004, to become the University of Manchester.) He moved to the University of Liverpool in 2018 to work in the Johnston Laboratories, which represented the world's first department of biochemistry at a University.

Kell's primary research interests are in systems biology, synthetic biology and computational biology. He led the consensus program to model the yeast metabolic network. He has also been involved in the development of multivariate scientific instrumentation and the attendant machine learning software (his first paper on artificial neural networks was in 1992). He has written extensively on the role of microbes (often dormant) as agents of supposedly 'non-communicable', chronic infectious diseases. This led to the discovery of the Rpf Resuscitation promoting factor that acts as a 'wake=up' molecule for organisms such as Mycobacterium tuberculosis, the agent of tuberculosis. His publications are mostly open access and widely cited, with an H-index at Google Scholar in excess of 130. According to Google Scholar his most cited peer-reviewed research papers are in functional genomics, metabolomics(a word he coinvented with Steve Oliver), and the yeast genome. He has also been involved in research to create a robot scientist in collaboration with Ross King, Stephen Muggleton and Steve Oliver, as well as several projects in systems biology. He is involved in the study of membrane transporters, and their necessary involvement in the transmembrane uptake of pharmaceutical drugs. He tends to choose scientific problems in which the prevailing orthodoxy is clearly incorrect. To this end, he has recently returned to the study of bioenergetics, summarising the detailed evidence against the prevailing wisdom of chemiosmotic coupling in oxidative and photosynthetic phosphorylation, replacing it with a protet-based model.

He is a strong believer in the importance of systematic reviews in Science, especially where they synthesise disparate evidence into a coherent picture. Examples include the role of unliganded iron in disease, amyloidogenic blood clotting, the protein-mediated transport of pharmaceutical drugs, electron transport-linked phosphorylation, nutraceuticals such as ergothioneine, lactoferrin and kynurenic acid, creativity and innovation, single cell analysis, biological dielectrics, philosophical questions such as hypothesis-dependent vs data-driven science and why people believe nonsense despite the facts, explainable AI, doing omics analyses better.

With his collaborator Resia Pretorius, Kell discovered the amyloidogenic clotting of blood, involving the amyloidogenic self-assembly of the clotting protein fibrin into highly stable β-sheets that — unlike regular clots — are resistant to plasmin, the enzyme responsible for breaking up clots (fibrinolysis). They report that such amyloidogenic clotting appears to be mostly caused by infectious agents, even in (a large variety of) supposedly non-infectious diseases. Kell and Pretorius report that such fibrin amyloid microclots (fibrinaloids) seem to be of major significance in long COVID. They also recently discovered that the clots removed from patients following an ischaemic stroke are amyloid in nature, which would explain their resistance to fibrinolysis and their likely production via accretion of fibrinaloid microclots. A new direction is the recognition of the involvement of the Traditional Chinese Medicine concept of Blood Stasis in a large variety of these chronic inflammatory diseases.

In 1988, he was a founding director] of Aber Instruments, based at Aberystwyth Science Park (originally at the Centre for Alternative Technology (CAT), Machynlleth, Wales). In 2019 he was a co-founding director of Mellizyme Ltd, now Epoch Biodesign; he left the company in 2023. He cofounded PhenUTest Ltd (now Innotive Diagnostics) in 2021. He was an Associated Scientific Director of the Centre for Biosustainability at the Technical University of Denmark, where he ran the Flux Optimisation and Bioanalytics Group.

Kell's research has been funded by the European Union (EU), the BBSRC, the Medical Research Council (MRC) and the Engineering and Physical Sciences Research Council (EPSRC). His former doctoral students and/or postdoctoral researchers include Pedro Mendes and Roy Goodacre. His monograph Belief: the baggage behind our being was published in 2018.

=== Awards and honours ===
Kell was appointed Commander of the Order of the British Empire (CBE) in the 2014 New Year Honours, for services to science and research. Kell is also a Fellow of the Learned Society of Wales (FLSW), a Fellow of the Royal Society of Biology (FRSB) and a Fellow of the American Association for the Advancement of Science (FAAS).

Government offices
Preceded by Julia Goodfellow	CEO of the Biotechnology and Biological Sciences Research Council; 2008–2013	Succeeded by Jackie Hunter
