= Sapiens: A Brief History of Humankind =

2014 book by Yuval Harari

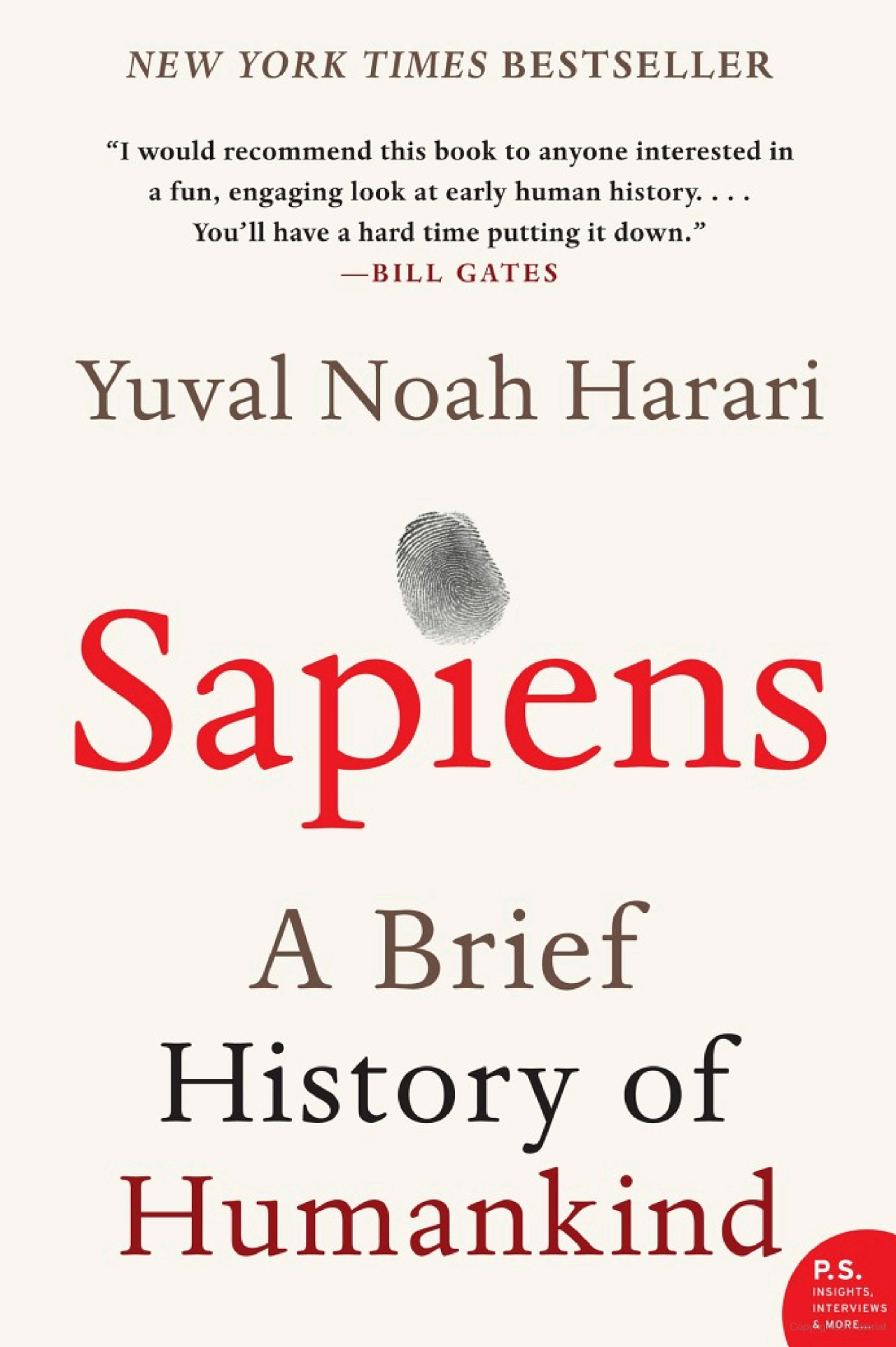
- Cover of the book
- Author: Yuval Noah Harari
- Original title: קיצור תולדות האנושות
- Language: Hebrew (2011); English (2014)
- Subject: History, social philosophy
- Genre: Nonfiction
- Publisher: Dvir Publishing House Ltd. (Israel); Random House; Harper
- Publication date: 2011
- Publication place: Israel
- Pages: 443
- ISBN: 978-0062316097
- Followed by: Homo Deus: A Brief History of Tomorrow

Sapiens: A Brief History of Humankind (Hebrew: קיצור תולדות האנושות, Qitzur Toldot ha-Enoshut) is a 2011 book by the Israeli military historian Yuval Noah Harari, based on a series of lectures he gave at the Hebrew University of Jerusalem. It was first published in Hebrew in Israel in 2011, and in English in 2014. The book surveys the history of humankind, beginning in the Stone Age and ending in the 21st century. The account relies on a fusion of the natural sciences with the social sciences.

== Summary ==
Harari's work places human history within a framework, with the natural sciences setting limits for human activity and social sciences shaping what happens within those bounds. The academic discipline of history is the account of cultural change.

Harari surveys the history of humankind from the Stone Age up to the 21st century, focusing on Homo sapiens. He divides the history of H. sapiens into four major parts:

1. The Cognitive Revolution (c. 70,000 BCE, the start of behavioral modernity when imagination evolved in H. sapiens).
2. The (first) Agricultural Revolution (c. 10,000 BCE, the development of agriculture).
3. The Unification of Humankind (c. 34 CE, the gradual consolidation of human political organizations towards globalization).
4. The Scientific Revolution (c. 1543 CE, the emergence of objective science).

Harari's main argument is that H. sapiens came to dominate the world because they are the only animal that can cooperate flexibly in large numbers. He argues that prehistoric H. sapiens were a key cause of the extinction of other human species such as the Neanderthals and numerous other megafauna. He further argues that the ability of H. sapiens to cooperate in large numbers arises from its unique capacity to believe in things existing purely in the imagination, such as gods, nations, money and human rights. He argues that these beliefs give rise to discrimination – whether racial, sexual or political – and it is potentially impossible to have a completely unbiased society. Harari claims that all large-scale human cooperation systems – including religions, political structures, trade networks and legal institutions – owe their emergence to H. sapiens' distinctive cognitive capacity for fiction. Accordingly, Harari describes money as a system of mutual trust and political and economic systems as similar to religions.

Harari's key claim regarding the Agricultural Revolution is that while it promoted population growth for H. sapiens and co-evolving species like wheat and cows, it made the lives of most individuals (and animals) worse than they had been when H. sapiens were mostly hunter-gatherers, since their diet and daily lives became significantly less varied. Humans' violent treatment of other animals is a theme that runs throughout the book.

In discussing the unification of humankind, Harari argues that over its history, the trend for H. sapiens has increasingly been towards political and economic interdependence. For centuries, the majority of humans lived in empires, and capitalist globalization is effectively producing one, global empire. Harari argues that money, empires, and universal religions are the principal drivers of this process.

Harari describes the Scientific Revolution as an innovation in European thought, whereby elites became willing to admit to and try to remedy their own ignorance. He describes this as one driver of early modern European imperialism and of the current convergence of human cultures. Harari also claims there is a lack of research into the history of happiness, positing that people today are not significantly happier than in past eras. He concludes by discussing how modern technology may soon end the species by ushering in genetic engineering, immortality, and non-organic life. Harari metaphorically describes humans as deities in that they can create species.

Harari cites Jared Diamond's Guns, Germs, and Steel (1997) as one of the greatest inspirations for the book.

== Reception ==
First published in Hebrew in 2011, the book was later released in English in 2014 and, according to Harari, has since been translated into 52 languages. It made The New York Times best-seller list, appearing for 182 weeks (as of May 2022) including 96 consecutive weeks. It won the National Library of China's Wenjin Book Award for the best book published in 2014. The Royal Society of Biologists in the UK shortlisted the book in its 2015 Book Awards. In 2016, Bill Gates ranked Sapiens among his ten favorite books.

In 2015 the Israel Museum in Jerusalem created a temporary exhibit of archeological and artistic displays to demonstrate the main themes found in the book.

Reviewing the book in 2014, the British daily The Times said "Sapiens is the kind of book that sweeps cobwebs out of your brain" and that it is "mind-thrilling". Philosopher Galen Strawson said that, among several other problems, "Much of Sapiens is extremely interesting, and it is often well expressed. As one reads on, however, the attractive features of the book are overwhelmed by carelessness, exaggeration and sensationalism". Kirkus Reviews awarded a star to the book, describing it as "the great debates of history aired out with satisfying vigor". The Sydney Morning Herald described the book as "always engaging and often provocative".

Science journalist Charles C. Mann concluded in a 2015 review in The Wall Street Journal, "There's a whiff of dorm-room bull sessions about the author's stimulating but often unsourced assertions." Evolutionary anthropologist Avi Tuschman points out problems stemming from the contradiction between Harari's "freethinking scientific mind" and his "fuzzier worldview hobbled by political correctness", but nonetheless wrote that "Harari's book is important reading for serious-minded, self-reflective sapiens."

Anthropologist Christopher Robert Hallpike, writing in 2017, did not find any "serious contribution to knowledge". Hallpike suggested that "...whenever his facts are broadly correct they are not new, and whenever he tries to strike out on his own he often gets things wrong, sometimes seriously". He considered it an infotainment publishing event offering a "wild intellectual ride across the landscape of history, dotted with sensational displays of speculation, and ending with blood-curdling predictions about human destiny."

In 2018, four years after its English-language publication, Alex Preston wrote in The Guardian that Sapiens had become a "publishing phenomenon" with "wild success" symptomatic of a broader trend toward "intelligent, challenging nonfiction, often books that are several years old". Concurrently, The Guardian listed the book as among the ten "best brainy books of the decade".

Discussing the book's success in 2020, Ian Parker writing for The New Yorker said "the book thrived in an environment of relative critical neglect" since it received few major reviews at the time of its release. Parker describes Sapiens' extremely broad scope as being a defense against expert criticism. Quoting Harari's academic advisor Steven Gunn, "Nobody's an expert on the meaning of everything, or the history of everybody, over a long period."

In a 2022 article titled "The Dangerous Populist Science of Yuval Noah Harari" for Current Affairs, neuroscientist Darshana Narayanan said: "We have been seduced by Harari because of the power not of his truth or scholarship but of his storytelling... Yuval Harari is what I call a “science populist.” ...Science populists are gifted storytellers who weave sensationalist yarns around scientific “facts” in simple, emotionally persuasive language. ...They understand the seduction of a story well told—relentlessly seeking to expand their audience—never mind that the underlying science is warped in the pursuit of fame and influence."

== Bibliographic details and legacy ==
The original Hebrew publication was first issued in 2011 as קיצור תולדות האנושות [Ḳitsur toldot ha-enoshut], which translates into A Brief History of Humankind.

A 2012 English translation was self-published with the title From Animals Into Gods. The English translation was published in 2015 as Sapiens: A Brief History of Humankind, "translated by the author with the help of John Purcell and Haim Watzman", simultaneously in London by Harvill Secker ISBN 978-1846558238 (hardback), ISBN 978-1846558245 (trade paperback) and in Canada by Signal (ISBN 978-0-7710-3850-1 (bound), ISBN 978-0-7710-3852-5 (html)). It was then republished in London by Vintage Books in 2015 (ISBN 978-0099590088 (paperback)).

In 2020 the first volume of the graphic novel version of the book was published simultaneously in several languages, with the title Sapiens: A Graphic History, Volume 1: The Birth of Humankind. It is credited as coauthored by Harari and David Vandermeulen, with adaptation and illustrations by Daniel Casanave. The second volume Sapiens: A Graphic History, Volume 2: The Pillars of Civilization was published in October 2021.

== See also ==
- Homo Deus: A Brief History of Tomorrow
- Nexus: A Brief History of Information Networks from the Stone Age to AI
- The Outline of History (H. G. Wells)
- Guns, Germs, and Steel (Jared Diamond)
- The 10,000 Year Explosion: How Civilization Accelerated Human Evolution (Gregory Cochran and Henry Harpending)
- The Dawn of Everything (David Graeber and David Wengrow)
- Symbolic culture
- Social constructionism
