= Ross D. King =

Professor at the University of Manchester

Ross King
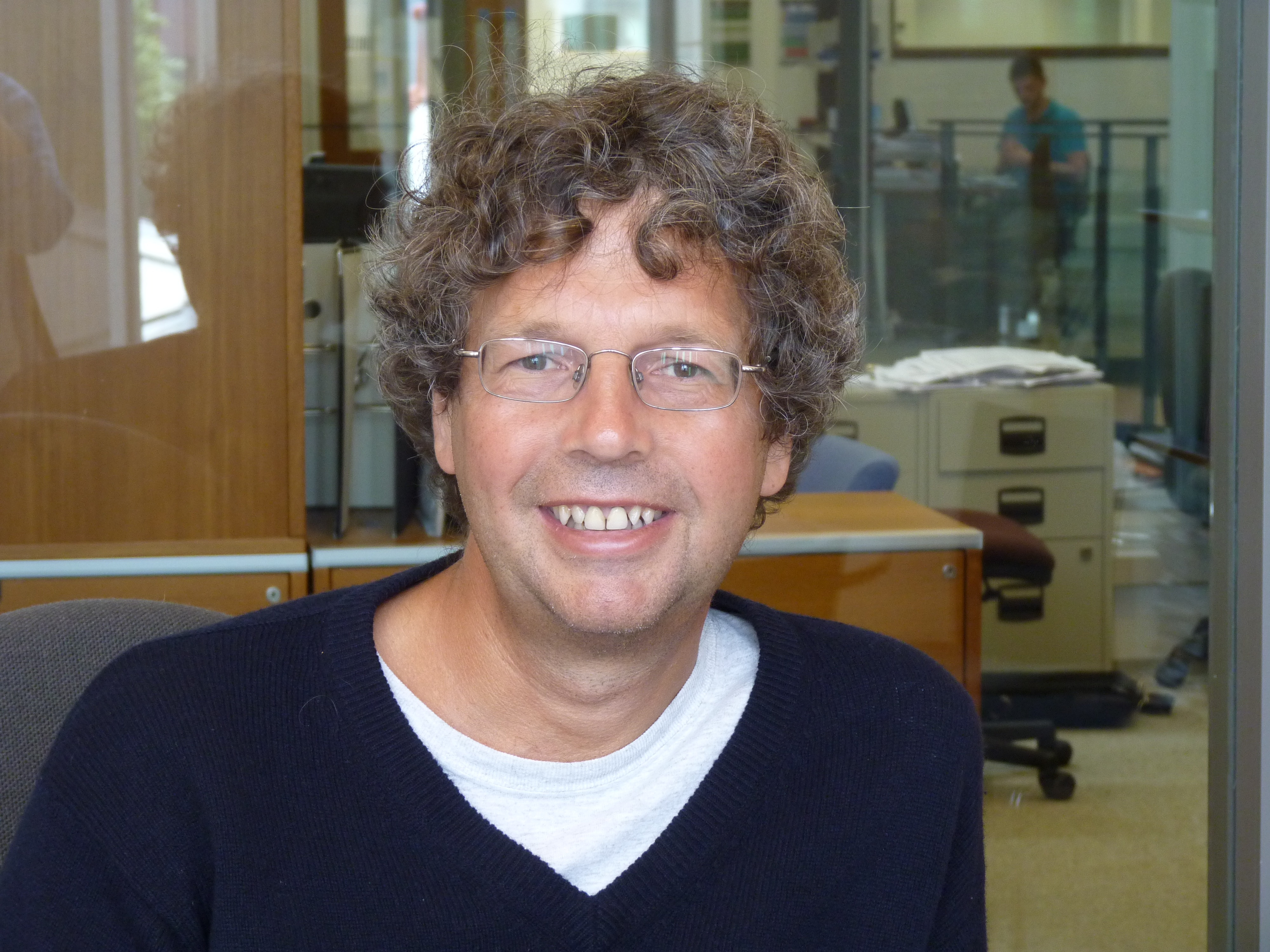
- Prof. Ross King, Chalmers University of Technology, Oct. 2019
- Born: Ross Donald King
- Education: University of Aberdeen (BSc); Newcastle University (MSc); University of Strathclyde (PhD)
- Known for: Robot Scientist
- Scientific career
- Fields: Automation of Science; Drug design; Artificial intelligence; Machine learning; Synthetic biology
- Workplaces: Chalmers University of Technology; University of Manchester; University of Aberdeen; Newcastle University; Aberystwyth University; University of Strathclyde; The Turing Institute; Manchester Institute of Biotechnology; School of Computer Science
- Thesis: A machine learning approach to the problem of predicting a protein's secondary structure from its primary structure (PROMIS) (1989)
- Doctoral advisor: Peter Mowforth; Douglas McGregor
- Website: www.chalmers.se/en/departments/bio/research/systems-biology/king-lab/Pages/default.aspx

Ross Donald King is a Professor of Machine Intelligence at Chalmers University of Technology.

== Education ==
King completed a Bachelor of Science degree in Microbiology at the University of Aberdeen in 1983 and went on to study for a Master of Science degree in Computer Science at the University of Newcastle in 1985. Following this, he completed a PhD at The Turing Institute at the University of Strathclyde in 1989 for work on developing machine learning methods for protein structure prediction.

== Research ==
King's research interests are in the automation of science, drug design, AI, machine learning and synthetic biology. He is probably best known for the Robot Scientist project which has created a robot that can:

- hypothesize to explain observations
- devise experiments to test these hypotheses
- physically run the experiments using laboratory robotics
- interpret the results from the experiments
- repeat the cycle as required

The Robot Scientist can autonomously execute high-throughput hypothesis led research. In addition to automating experimentation Robot Scientists are well suited to recording scientific knowledge: as the experiments are conceived and executed automatically by computer, it is possible to completely capture and digitally curate all aspects of the scientific process. Robot Scientist is the first machine to have been demonstrated to have discovered novel scientific knowledge. A new Robot Scientist Eve is designed to automate drug discovery. Eve automates high-throughput screening, hit confirmation, and lead generation through QSAR learning and testing. Eve is being applied to the discovery of lead compounds for neglected tropical diseases.

King's research has been funded by the EPSRC and the BBSRC., European Union, HEFCW, the Royal Academy of Engineering and JISC. He worked at Aberystwyth University for 15 years then moved to Manchester in January 2012. He left the School of Computer Science at the University of Manchester in 2019 and moved to Chalmers University of Technology.

He has an h-index of 54 according to Google Scholar.

== Collaborations ==
In 2000 King was a founder of the spin-out company PharmaDM, which developed data mining tools for the pharmaceutical industry. The company was based largely on research applying data mining to bioinformatics and chemoinformatics. The other scientific founders come from the University of Oxford and Leuven.

King has also developed an algorithm for converting protein coding DNA sequences into music with Colin Angus of The Shamen. The song S2-translation based on this is in the Rough Guide to Rock, and was on an album that sold more than 100,000 copies.
