= Cloud laboratory =

Life science laboratory automation approach

A cloud laboratory is a heavily automated, centralized research laboratory where scientists can run an experiment from a computer in a remote location. Cloud laboratories offer the execution of life science research experiments under a cloud computing service model, allowing researchers to retain full control over experimental design. Users create experimental protocols through a high-level API and the experiment is executed in the cloud laboratory, with no need for the user to be involved.

Cloud labs reduce variability in experimental execution, as the code can be interrogated, analyzed, and executed repeatedly. They democratize access to expensive laboratory equipment while standardizing experimental execution, which could potentially help address the replication crisis—what might before have been described in a paper as "mix the samples" is replaced by instructions for a specified machine to mix at a specified rpm rate for a specified time, with relevant factors such as the ambient temperature logged. They also reduce costs by sharing capital costs across many users, by running experiments in parallel, and reducing instrument downtime. Finally, they facilitate collaboration by making it easier to share protocols, data, and data processing methods through the cloud.

== Infrastructure ==
Cloud labs utilize common scientific techniques including DNA sequencing and genotyping, high-performance liquid chromatography (HPLC), protein extraction, plate reading, upstream bioprocessing, and western blotting. Users begin by signing up and logging in to the web-based software interface. Researchers submit their protocols via a dedicated web application or through an API, and when the order arrives at the laboratory, human operators set up the experiment and transfer plates from machine to machine. Data is automatically uploaded to the cloud lab via an API where users can access and analyze it. Users can review controls, machine settings, and reagents used. Multiple experiments can be run in parallel, 24 hours a day.

A true cloud lab is defined by five criteria:

1. Users must be able to conduct experiments on-demand at any time from any location, all through a computer interface.
2. The cloud laboratory must enable a user to digitally replicate the experience of standing in a traditional laboratory and manually operating instruments. It must allow users to specify all aspects of their experiments remotely without lead time, additional software, or outside experts
3. Users must have on-demand access to all the instruments needed to perform their experiment, rendering a physical laboratory unnecessary.
4. Users must be able to perform sample preparation, as well as storage and handling, from a remote setting.
5. Users must be able to script and connect multiple experiments, and conduct data analysis, using a single standardized computer interface.

== Using a cloud laboratory vs. high-throughput experimentation ==
High-throughput experimentation involves increasing throughput by scaling up the number of experiments that can be run in parallel using a common sample form factor and technique. When space or materials are limited, minor factors must be assigned to progressively smaller fractions to increase the number of replicates. Cloud labs, on the other hand, do not fundamentally scale up a single experiment but rather increase the number of types of experiments that can be run in parallel. For example, with a cloud lab, a scientist could simultaneously attempt dozens of different purification methods that each uses completely unique equipment sets.

HTE work cells can sometimes be accessed remotely to trigger a run on a library or digitally monitor a run. However, this remote monitoring or screen triggering does not impact the development that must take place in advance of a run. Often with HTE, scientists must group samples into libraries that use the same or very similar form factor containers such that the work cell can more easily traffic and address each sample in an integrated manner. Therefore, scientists need to standardize sample form factors of samples and handle the sample prep offline of the work cell. Cloud labs can work with samples in hundreds or even thousands of unique containers, providing additional flexibility relative to traditional labs (even those that are using HTE), and allowing processing of a larger number of samples.

Cloud labs are intended to replace the driver of traditional lab work by offering scientists the capability to conduct the same type of work they would typically perform in a traditional lab, except unrestricted by time and laboratory space.

== History ==
Cloud laboratories were built on advancements made in laboratory automation in the 1990s. In the early 1990s, the modularity project of the Consortium of Automated Analytical Laboratory Systems worked to define standards by which biotechnology manufacturers could produce products that could be integrated into automated systems. In 1996, the National Committee for Clinical Laboratory Standards (now the Clinical and Laboratory Standards Institute) proposed laboratory automation standards that aimed to enable consumers of laboratory technology to purchase hardware and software from different vendors and connect them to each other seamlessly. The committee launched five subcommittees in 1997 and released standardization protocols to guide product development through the early 2000s.

These early developments in interoperability led to early examples of lab automation using cloud infrastructure, such as the Robot Scientist "Adam" in 2009. This robot encapsulated and connected all the laboratory equipment necessary to perform microbial batch experiments.

In 2010, D. J. Kleinbaum and Brian Frezza founded antiviral developer Emerald Therapeutics. To simplify laboratory testing, the group wrote centralized management software for their collection of scientific instruments and a database to store all metadata and results.

In 2012, Transcriptic founded a robotic cloud laboratory for on-demand scientific research, which performed select tasks including DNA cloning remotely.

In 2014, Emerald Therapeutics spun out the Emerald Cloud Lab to fully replace the need for a traditional lab environment, enabling scientists from around the world to perform all necessary activities, from experimental design to data acquisition and analysis.

Carnegie Mellon University's Mellon College of Science is building the world's first academic cloud laboratory on their campus. The 20,000 square foot laboratory will be completed in 2023 and offer access to CMU researchers and eventually to other schools and life-sciences startups in Pittsburgh.

== Risks ==
Easy access to sophisticated labs can be a potential biosecurity or bioterrorism threat. Filippa Lentzos, an expert in biological risk and biosecurity, said "there are some pretty crazy people out there ... Barriers are coming down if you want to deliberately do something harmful". Cloud labs say that they review all scheduled experiments and can flag or reject any that appear illegal or dangerous, and that detailed record-keeping makes monitoring what is done easier than in a traditional laboratory.
