= Peter Goodfellow (geneticist) =

British geneticist (born 1951)

- Born: Peter Neville Goodfellow; 4 August 1951 (age 75)
- Education: University of Bristol (BSc); University of Oxford (DPhil)
- Spouse: Julia Mary Lansdall (m. 1972)
- Children: Two
- Awards: FRS (1992); FMedSci (1998); Louis-Jeantet Prize for Medicine (1995)
- Scientific career
- Workplaces: University of Cambridge
- Thesis: Biochemical and genetic studies of human tissue antigens (1975)
- Doctoral advisor: Walter Bodmer

Peter Neville Goodfellow (born 4 August 1951) is a British geneticist best known for his work on sex determination and the SRY gene that encodes testis determining factor. He was Arthur Balfour Professor of Genetics at the University of Cambridge from 1992 to 1996.

== Education ==
Goodfellow completed his Bachelor of Science degree in Microbiology at the University of Bristol in 1972 and was awarded a Doctor of Philosophy degree from the University of Oxford in 1975 for research supervised by Walter Bodmer.

== Awards and honours ==
Goodfellow was elected a Fellow of the Royal Society (FRS) in 1992. He was one of the recipients, together with Robin Lovell-Badge, of the 1995 Louis-Jeantet Prize for Medicine. He was elected a Fellow of the Academy of Medical Sciences in 1998. In 2002, he received an Honorary Doctor of Science (Hon DSc) degree from the University of Bristol.

== Personal life ==
In 1972 he married Julia Mary Lansdall, former CEO of the BBSRC. They have a son and a daughter.
