= Hallpike =

Hallpike is a surname. Notable people with the surname include:

- Charles Skinner Hallpike (1900–1979), English otologist
- Christopher Robert Hallpike (born 1938), English-Canadian anthropologist
