= Laboratory automation =

Process improvement strategy for routine procedures

Automated laboratory equipment

Laboratory automation is the use of automated equipment, robotics and software to perform or coordinate processes in a laboratory with reduced human intervention. Automation can range from individual instruments that perform specific tasks to integrated systems that coordinate multiple stages of an experimental or analytical workflow. It is used in areas including clinical testing, high-throughput screening, biotechnology, chemistry and materials science.

Laboratory automation can increase experimental throughput, reduce repetitive manual work, and improve the consistency of laboratory processes. Automated systems may include liquid-handling equipment, autosamplers, analytical instruments, robotic workstations, sample-transport systems and software for controlling instruments and coordinating workflows.

More recently, laboratory automation has been combined with algorithmic experimental planning in self-driving laboratories and other autonomous laboratory systems. These systems use results from automated experiments to select subsequent experiments, creating a closed-loop process in which experimental execution, measurement, analysis and planning are integrated.

== History ==
At least since 1875 there have been reports of automated devices for scientific investigation. These first devices were mostly built by scientists themselves in order to solve problems in the laboratory. After the second world war, companies started to provide automated equipment with greater and greater complexity.

Automation steadily spread in laboratories through the 20th century, but then a revolution took place: in the early 1980s, the first fully automated laboratory was opened by Dr. Masahide Sasaki. In 1993, Dr. Rod Markin at the University of Nebraska Medical Center created one of the world's first clinical automated laboratory management systems. In the mid-1990s, he chaired a standards group called the Clinical Testing Automation Standards Steering Committee (CTASSC) of the American Association for Clinical Chemistry, which later evolved into an area committee of the Clinical and Laboratory Standards Institute. In 2004, the National Institutes of Health (NIH) and more than 300 nationally recognized leaders in academia, industry, government, and the public completed the NIH Roadmap to accelerate medical discovery to improve health. The NIH Roadmap clearly identifies technology development as a mission critical factor in the Molecular Libraries and Imaging Implementation Group (see the first theme – New Pathways to Discovery – at https://web.archive.org/web/20100611171315/http://nihroadmap.nih.gov/).

Despite the success of Dr. Sasaki laboratory and others of the kind, the multi-million dollar cost of such laboratories has prevented adoption by smaller groups. This is all the more difficult because devices made by different manufacturers often cannot communicate with each other. However, recent advances based on the use of scripting languages like Autoit have made possible the integration of equipment from different manufacturers. Using this approach, many low-cost electronic devices, including open-source devices, become compatible with common laboratory instruments.

Some startups such as Emerald Cloud Lab and Strateos provide on-demand and remote laboratory access on a commercial scale. A 2017 study indicates that these commercial-scale, fully integrated automated laboratories can improve reproducibility and transparency in basic biomedical experiments, and that over nine in ten biomedical papers use methods currently available through these groups.

== Low-cost laboratory automation ==
A large obstacle to the implementation of automation in laboratories has been its high cost. Many laboratory instruments are very expensive. This is justifiable in many cases, as such equipment can perform very specific tasks employing cutting-edge technology. However, there are devices employed in the laboratory that are not highly technological but still are very expensive. This is the case of many automated devices, which perform tasks that could easily be done by simple and low-cost devices like simple robotic arms, universal (open-source) electronic modules, Lego Mindstorms, or 3D printers.

So far, using such low-cost devices together with laboratory equipment was considered to be difficult. However, it has been demonstrated that such low-cost devices can substitute for the standard machines used in laboratory without problems. It can be anticipated that more laboratories will take advantage of this as low-cost automation is very attractive for laboratories.

A technology that enables the integration of any machine regardless of their brand is scripting, more specifically, scripting involving the control of mouse clicks and keyboard entries, like AutoIt. By timing clicks and keyboard inputs, different software interfaces controlling different devices can be perfectly synchronized.
