= 21 Lessons for the 21st Century =

2018 book by Yuval Noah Harari

- Cover of the book
- Author: Yuval Noah Harari
- Language: English
- Subject: Social philosophy
- Publisher: Spiegel & Grau, Jonathan Cape
- Publication date: 2018
- Publication place: Israel
- English publication date: 30 August 2018
- Pages: 372
- ISBN: 978-198-480-149-4
- OCLC: 1029771757
- Preceded by: Homo Deus: A Brief History of Tomorrow

21 Lessons for the 21st Century is a book written by Israeli author Yuval Noah Harari and published in August 2018 by Spiegel & Grau in the US and by Jonathan Cape in the UK.

The book consists of five parts, each containing four or five essays. The book focuses on present-day issues and societal questions.

== Content of the Book ==
The Book is divided into five parts containing 21 lessons about political, technological, social, and existential challenges facing humanity in the 21st century.

=== Part I - The Technological Challenge ===
Yuval Noah Harari discusses how AI, automation and biotechnology may transform society and threaten traditional ideas about work, freedom, and equality.

=== Part II - The Political Challenge ===
This section examines nationalism, religion, immigration, and global cooperation.

=== Part III - Despair and Hope ===
Harari explores terrorism, war, humility, and justice.

=== Part IV - Truth ===
This part focuses on misinformation, propaganda, fake news, and how societies construct narratives.

=== Part V - Resilience ===
The final section turns toward personal meaning and mental clarity.

== Critical response ==
The book had articles and reviews published by The New York Times, The Economist, Financial Times, The Guardian, New Statesman, and The Times.

In The New York Times, Bill Gates calls the book "fascinating" and his author "such a stimulating writer that even when I disagreed, I wanted to keep reading and thinking." For Gates, Harari "has teed up a crucial global conversation about how to take on the problems of the 21st century."

John Thornhill in Financial Times said that "[although] 21 Lessons is lit up by flashes of intellectual adventure and literary verve, it is probably the least illuminating of the three books" written by Harari, and that many of the observations in it feel recycled from the two others. Helen Lewis review in The Guardian is not as glowing but admires "the ambition and breadth of his work, smashing together unexpected ideas into dazzling observations."

The book has also received negative reviews. Gavin Jacobson in the New Statesman sees it as "a study thick with promise and thin in import" with advice "either too vague or too hollow to provide any meaningful guidance." In The Times, Gerard DeGroot writes: "The author of Sapiens is good at identifying the crises to come but his syrupy platitudes are no answer."

== Russian translation ==
A Russian translation of Harari's book was published in June 2019. However, the Russian media noticed that several passages about Russia and its President Putin were excluded from the translation. In particular, the chapter about post-truth begins in the Russian edition by referring to Donald Trump's speeches instead of Putin's false statements during the Russian annexation of Crimea. The representatives of Harari admitted that this change was authorized.

Leonid Bershidsky in Moscow Times called it "caution — or, to call it by its proper name, cowardice", and Nettanel Slyomovics in Haaretz claimed that Harari "is sacrificing those same liberal ideas that he presumes to represent". In a response, Harari stated that he "was warned that due to these few examples Russian censorship will not allow distribution of a Russian translation of the book" and that he "therefore faced a dilemma", namely to "replace these few examples with other examples, and publish the book in Russia," or "change nothing, and publish nothing", and that he "preferred publishing, because Russia is a leading global power and it seemed important that the book's ideas should reach readers in Russia, especially as the book is still very critical of the Putin regime – just without naming names."

== See also ==
- Sapiens: A Brief History of Humankind
- Homo Deus: A Brief History of Tomorrow
