= Dataism =

Ideology created by big data

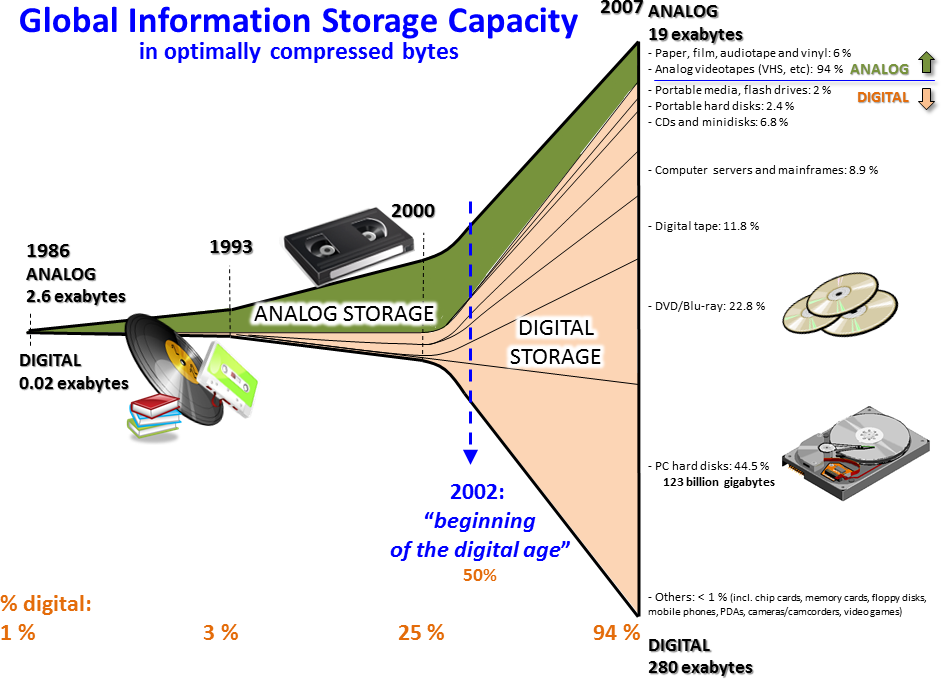
Chart showing the growth and digitization of global information storage capacity

Dataism is a term that has been used to describe the mindset or philosophy created by the emerging significance of big data. It was first used by David Brooks in The New York Times in 2013. The term has been expanded to describe what historian Yuval Noah Harari, in his book Homo Deus: A Brief History of Tomorrow from 2015, calls an emerging ideology or even a new form of religion, in which "information flow" is the "supreme value". In art, the term was used by Albert-Laszlo Barabasi to refer to an artist movement that uses data as its primary source of inspiration.

== History ==
"If you asked me to describe the rising philosophy of the day, I'd say it is Data-ism", wrote David Brooks in The New York Times in February 2013. Brooks argued that in a world of increasing complexity, relying on data could reduce cognitive biases and "illuminate patterns of behavior we haven't yet noticed".

In 2015, Steve Lohr's book Data-ism looked at how Big Data is transforming society, using the term to describe the Big Data revolution.

In his 2016 book Homo Deus: A Brief History of Tomorrow, Yuval Noah Harari argues that all competing political or social structures can be seen as data processing systems: "Dataism declares that the universe consists of data flows, and the value of any phenomenon or entity is determined by its contribution to data processing" and "we may interpret the entire human species as a single data processing system, with individual humans serving as its chips." According to Harari, a Dataist should want to "maximise dataflow by connecting to more and more media". Harari predicts that the logical conclusion of this process is that, eventually, humans will give algorithms the authority to make the most important decisions in their lives, such as whom to marry and which career to pursue. Harari argues that Aaron Swartz could be called the "first martyr" of Dataism.

In 2022, Albert-László Barabási coined the term "Dataism" to define an artistic movement that positions data as the central means of understanding nature, society, technology, and human essence. This movement underscores the necessity for art to integrate with data to stay relevant in contemporary society.

Dataism responds to the intricacy and interconnectedness of modern social, economic, and technological realms, which exceed individual understanding. Advocating for the use of methodologies from various fields like science, business, and politics in art, Dataism sees this fusion as essential for art to retain its significance and influence.

== Criticism ==
Commenting on Harari's characterisation of Dataism, security analyst Daniel Miessler believes that Dataism does not present the challenge to the ideology of liberal humanism that Harari claims, because humans will simultaneously be able to believe in their own importance and that of data.

Harari himself raises some criticisms, such as the problem of consciousness, which Dataism is unlikely to illuminate. Humans may also find out that organisms are not algorithms, he suggests. Dataism implies that all data is public, even personal data, to make the system work as a whole, which is a factor that's already showing resistance today.

Other analysts, such as Terry Ortleib, have looked at the extent to which Dataism poses a dystopian threat to humanity.

The Facebook–Cambridge Analytica data scandal showed how political leaders manipulated Facebook's users' data to build specific psychological profiles that went on to manipulate the network. A team of data analysts reproduced the AI technology developed by Cambridge Analytica around Facebook's data and was able to define the following rules: 10 likes enables a machine to know a person like a coworker, 70 likes like a friend would, 150 likes like a parent would, 300 likes like a lover would, and beyond it may be possible to know a people better than they know themselves.

== See also ==
- Transhumanism
- Futurism
- Surveillance capitalism
- Facebook–Cambridge Analytica data scandal
