= Robot Scientist =

Laboratory robot

- Type of project: Scientific Research
- Location: University of Manchester; Aberystwyth University; Imperial College London; University of Cambridge; Robert Gordon University
- Owner: Ross King
- Established: 2004
- Funding: EPSRC; BBSRC

Robot Scientist (also known as Adam) is a laboratory robot created and developed by a group of scientists including Ross King, Kenneth Whelan, Ffion Jones, Philip Reiser, Christopher Bryant, Stephen Muggleton, Douglas Kell, Emma Byrne and Steve Oliver.

== Prototype ==
As a prototype for a "robot scientist", Adam is able to perform independent experiments to test hypotheses and interpret findings without human guidance, removing some of the drudgery of laboratory experimentation. Adam is capable of:

- hypothesizing to explain observations
- devising experiments to test these hypotheses
- physically running the experiments using laboratory robotics
- interpreting the results from the experiments
- repeating the cycle as required

While researching yeast-based functional genomics, Adam became the first machine in history to have discovered new scientific knowledge independently of its human creators.

== Adam and Eve ==
Adam's research studied baker's yeast (Saccharomyces cerevisiae) and is one of two robot scientists along with "Eve" (named after Adam and Eve), a robot currently doing research on drug screening.

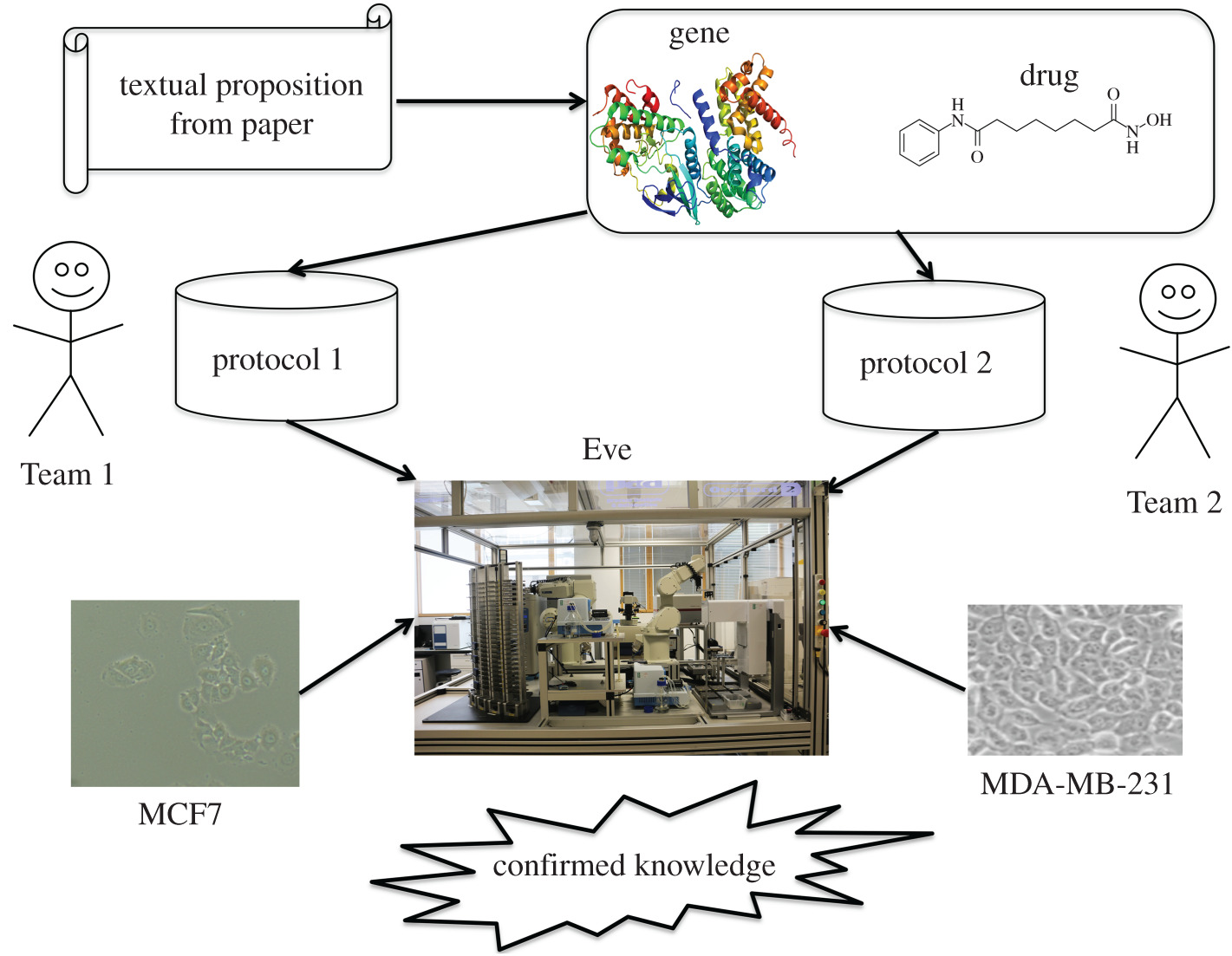
The overall process of testing the reproducibility and robustness of the cancer biology literature via Eve

Eve has been used for semi-automated testing for reproducibility of experimental cancer research.

== See also ==
- Graffiti (program)
