= Yuval Noah Harari =

Israeli historian and philosopher (born 1976)

- יובל נח הררי
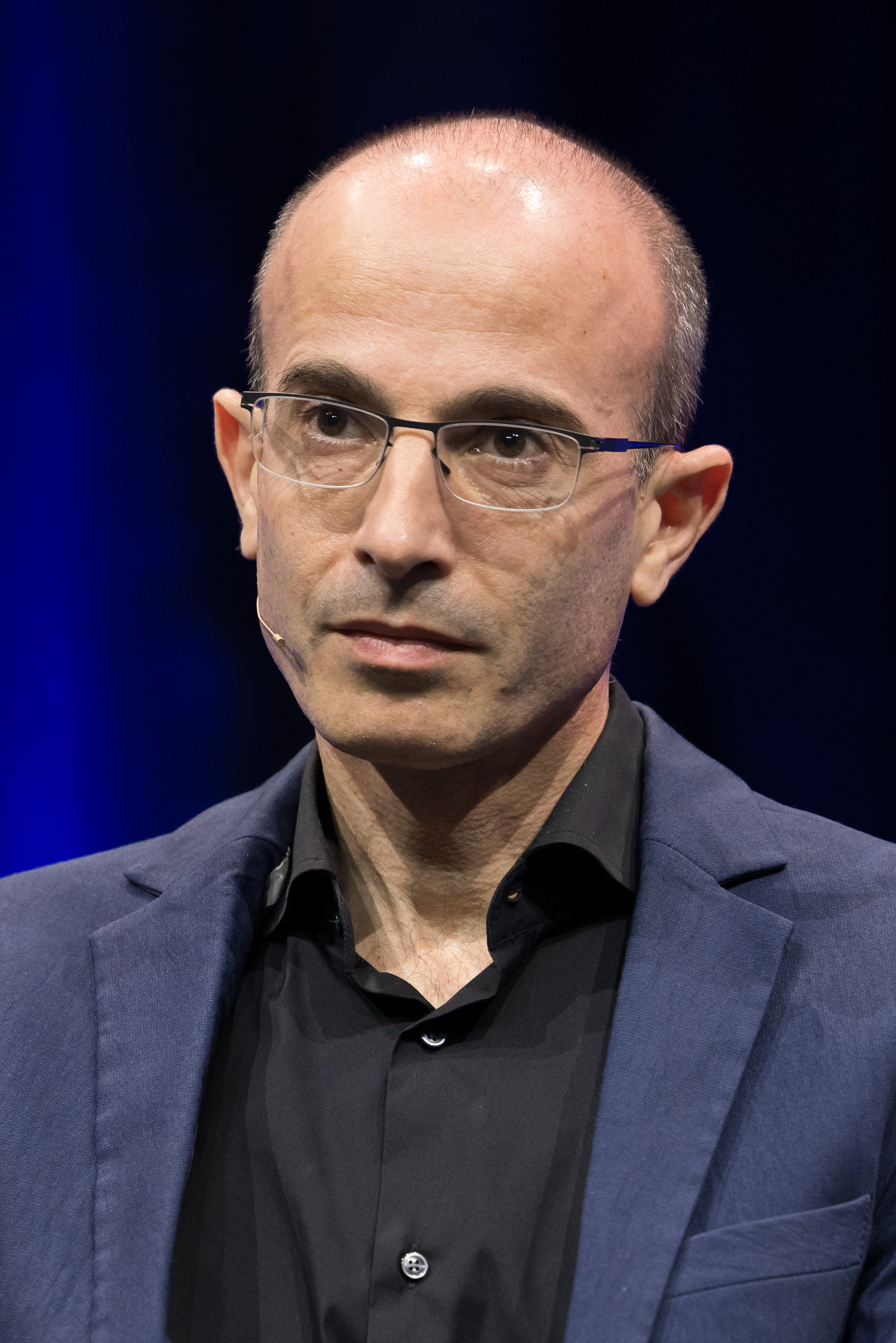
- Harari in 2024
- Born: Kiryat Ata, Israel
- Known for: Sapiens: A Brief History of Humankind (2011); Homo Deus: A Brief History of Tomorrow (2015); 21 Lessons for the 21st Century (2018); Nexus: A Brief History of Information Networks from the Stone Age to AI (2024)
- Spouse: Itzik Yahav

Academic background
- Education: Hebrew University of Jerusalem (BA); University of Oxford (DPhil)
- Thesis: History and I: War and the Relations between History and Personal Identity in Renaissance Military Memoirs, c. 1450–1600 (2002)
- Doctoral advisor: Steven Gunn

Academic work
- Discipline: Big History; Military history Social philosophy Technology
- Institutions: Centre for the Study of Existential Risk, University of Cambridge
- Website: www.ynharari.com

Yuval Noah Harari (Note: Hebrew: יובל נח הררי [juˈval ˈnoaχ haˈʁaʁi]) (born 1976) is an Israeli medievalist, military historian, public intellectual, and popular science writer. He is a professor of history at the Hebrew University of Jerusalem. His first bestselling book, Sapiens: A Brief History of Humankind (2011) is based on his lectures to an undergraduate world history class. His other works include the bestsellers Homo Deus: A Brief History of Tomorrow (2016), 21 Lessons for the 21st Century (2018), and Nexus: A Brief History of Information Networks from the Stone Age to AI (2024). His published work examines themes of free will, consciousness, intelligence, happiness, suffering and the role of storytelling in human evolution.

In Sapiens, Harari writes about a "cognitive revolution" that supposedly occurred roughly 70,000 years ago when Homo sapiens supplanted the rival Neanderthals and other species of the genus Homo, developed language skills and structured societies, and ascended as apex predators, aided by the First Agricultural Revolution and accelerated by the Scientific Revolution, which have allowed humans to approach near mastery over their environment. Furthermore, he examines the possible consequences of a futuristic biotechnological world in which intelligent biological organisms are surpassed by their own creations; he has said, "Homo sapiens as we know them will disappear in a century or so". Although Harari's books have received considerable commercial success since the publication of Sapiens, his work has been criticized for sensationalism and speculation in academic circles.

== Early life and education ==
Yuval Noah Harari was born and raised in Haifa to Lebanese parents. His father, Shlomo Harari, born Blajberg. was a state-employed armaments engineer, and his mother, Pnina, born Luttinger, was an office administrator. Harari taught himself to read at age three. He studied in a class for intellectually gifted children at the Leo Baeck Education Center in Haifa from the age of eight. He deferred mandatory military service in the Israel Defense Forces to pursue university studies as part of the Atuda program but was later exempted from completing his military service following his studies due to health issues. He began studying history and international relations at the Hebrew University of Jerusalem at age 17.

Harari studied at the Hebrew University of Jerusalem from 1993 to 1998, where he received a B.A. degree and specialised in medieval history and military history. He completed his D.Phil. degree at the University of Oxford in 2002 where he was a postgraduate student of Jesus College, Oxford supervised by Steven J. Gunn. From 2003 to 2005, he pursued postdoctoral studies in history as a Yad Hanadiv Fellow. While at Oxford, Harari first encountered the work of Jared Diamond, whom he has acknowledged as an influence on his own writing. At a Berggruen Institute salon, Harari said that Diamond's Guns, Germs, and Steel "was kind of an epiphany in my academic career. I realised that I could actually write such books."

== Career ==
Harari has published multiple books and articles, including Special Operations in the Age of Chivalry, 1100–1550; The Ultimate Experience: Battlefield Revelations and the Making of Modern War Culture, 1450–2000; The Concept of 'Decisive Battles' in World History; and Armchairs, Coffee and Authority: Eye-witnesses and Flesh-witnesses Speak about War, 1100–2000.

His book Sapiens: A Brief History of Humankind was originally published in Hebrew in 2011 based on the 20 lectures of an undergraduate world history class he was teaching. It was then released in English in 2014 and has since been translated into some 45 languages. The book surveys the entire length of human history, starting from the evolution of Homo sapiens in the Stone Age. Harari compares indigenous peoples to apes in his fall of man narrative, leading up to the political and technological revolutions of the 21st century. The Hebrew edition became a bestseller in Israel, and generated much interest among the general public. Joseph Drew wrote that "Sapiens provides a wide-ranging and thought-provoking introduction for students of comparative civilization," considering it as a work that "highlights the importance and wide expanse of the social sciences."

In 2016 at the Davos Forum, Harari was the originator of the idea that, as a result of the Fourth Industrial Revolution, "humanity will be divided between a superelite of improved humans and a mass of 'useless people'" and that "power is in the hands of those who control the algorithms". He returned to the theme in an October 2017 interview with People's Daily Online to which he said:

humankind is on the verge of the greatest revolution ever. The combination of machine learning and biotechnology will give humankind the ability to start engineering new life forms such as cyborgs, super-humans and AI. The main products of the future economy will not be food, textiles and vehicles, but rather bodies, brains and minds. This will be not just the greatest revolution in history, but the greatest revolution in biology since the appearance of life on earth. For four billion years life was governed by the laws of natural selection, and life was confined to the organic realm. During all these eons, whether you were a virus or a dinosaur, you evolved according the principles of natural selection and you were made of organic compounds. In the coming century, however, science is likely to usher the era of inorganic life shaped by intelligent design. The new powers of AI and bioengineering will not be shared equally by all humans. Rather, they will probably be monopolizing by a small number of countries. At present it seems highly likely that the two most important countries that will develop these new powers are the USA and China.

Harari's follow-up book, Homo Deus: A Brief History of Tomorrow, was published in 2016 and examines the possibilities for the future of Homo sapiens. The book's premise outlines that, in the future, humanity is likely to make a significant attempt to gain happiness, immortality and God-like powers. The book speculates on the future of Homo sapiens based on the past and present. Among several possibilities for the future, Harari develops the term dataism for a philosophy or mindset that worships big data. Writing in The New York Times Book Review, Siddhartha Mukherjee stated that although the book "fails to convince me entirely," he considers it "essential reading for those who think about the future."

Harari's book, 21 Lessons for the 21st Century, (2018), focused more on present-day concerns. The book received mixed reviews. Kirkus Reviews praised the book as a "tour de force" and described it as a "highly instructive exploration of current affairs and the immediate future of human societies,", but the book was also criticized for stating "excruciating banalities" and for omissions in the Russian edition of the book

In 2020 the first volume of his graphic adaptation of Sapiens: A Brief History of Humankind, Sapiens: A Graphic History – The Birth of Humankind, co-authored with David Vandermeulen and Daniel Casanave, was published and launched at a livestream event organised by How to Academy and Penguin Books.

In 2022, Harari's book, Unstoppable Us: How Humans Took Over the World, illustrated by Ricard Zaplana Ruiz, was published and is a "Story of Human History — for Kids." In fewer than 200 pages of child-friendly language, Harari covers the same content as his best-selling book Sapiens: A Brief History of Humankind, but "he has simplified the presentation for this younger audience without dumbing it down." This book is "the first of four planned volumes."

== Critical reception ==
Harari's popular publications are considered to belong to the Big History genre, with Ian Parker writing in 2020 in The New Yorker that "Harari did not invent Big History, but updated it with hints of self-help and futurology, as well as a high-altitude, almost nihilistic composure about human suffering."

His work has been more negatively received in academic circles, with Christopher Robert Hallpike stating in a 2020 review of Sapiens that "we should not judge Sapiens as a serious contribution to knowledge but as 'infotainment', a publishing event to titillate its readers by a wild intellectual ride across the landscape of history, dotted with sensational displays of speculation, and ending with blood-curdling predictions about human destiny. By these criteria, it is a most successful book."

In 2020, philosopher Mike W. Martin criticised Harari's view in a journal article, stating that "[Harari] misunderstands human rights, inflates the role of science in moral matters, and fails to reconcile his moral passion with his moral skepticism."

In July 2022, the American magazine Current Affairs published an article titled "The Dangerous Populist Science of Yuval Noah Harari" by neuroscientist Darshana Narayanan, which pointed to the lack of scientific rigour in his books. "The best-selling author is a gifted storyteller and popular speaker," she wrote. "But he sacrifices science for sensationalism, and his work is riddled with errors."

In 2022, the German newspaper Frankfurter Allgemeine Zeitung called Harari a historian and a brand. It pointed out that the Yahav Harari Group, built by his partner Yahav, was a "booming product cosmos" selling comics and children's books, and soon films and documentaries. It observed an "icy deterministic touch" in his books, which made them so popular in Silicon Valley. It stated that his listeners celebrated him like a pop star, although he only had the sad message that people are "bad algorithms", soon to be redundant, to be replaced because machines could do it better.

== Awards and recognition ==
Harari twice won the Polonsky Prize for "Creativity and Originality", in 2009 and 2012. In 2011, he won the Society for Military History's Moncado Award for outstanding articles in military history. In 2012, he was elected to the Young Israeli Academy of Sciences.

Sapiens was in the top 3 of The New York Times Best Seller list for 96 consecutive weeks. In 2018, Harari gave the first TED Talk as a digital avatar.

In 2016, 2018, 2020, and 2026, Harari spoke at the World Economic Forum annual conference in Davos.

In 2026, Harari delivered the Tanner Lecture on Human Values at Linacre College, Oxford.

== Personal life ==
Harari met his husband-to-be, Itzik Yahav, in 2002. Yahav has also been Harari's personal manager. They married in a civil ceremony in Toronto, Canada, because Israel recognises civil marriages (same sex or opposite sex) when they are conducted abroad. He lives in a middle-class suburb of Tel Aviv.

Harari is an atheist. He has practised Vipassana meditation since 2000 and said that it "transformed" his life. As of 2017, he practised for two hours every day (one hour each at the start and end of his work day); every year undertook a meditation retreat of 30 days or longer, in silence and with no books or social media; and is an assistant meditation teacher. He dedicated Homo Deus to "my teacher, S. N. Goenka, who lovingly taught me important things", and said "I could not have written this book without the focus, peace and insight gained from practising Vipassana for fifteen years." He also regards meditation as a way to research.

Harari is a vegan and says this resulted from his research, including his view that the foundation of the dairy industry is breaking the bond between mother cow and calf. As of May 2021, Harari did not have a smartphone, but in an interview in October 2023, he explained that he owned a smartphone only for use in travel and emergencies.

During the COVID-19 pandemic, following the then United States President Donald Trump's cut to WHO funding, Harari announced that he and his husband would donate $1 million to the WHO through Sapienship, their social impact company.

Harari is among the critics of Israeli Prime Minister Benjamin Netanyahu, and is specifically opposed to the judicial reform plans of the thirty-seventh government of Israel. In a conversation with Lex Fridman in 2023 he said: "... And now the Netanyahu government is trying to neutralize, or take over, the Supreme Court, and they've already prepared a long list of laws – they already talk about it – that will be passed the moment that this last check on the power is gone, they are openly trying to gain unlimited power".

== Books authored ==
- Renaissance Military Memoirs: War, History and Identity, 1450–1600 (Woodbridge: Boydell & Brewer, 2004), ISBN 978-184-383-064-1
- Special Operations in the Age of Chivalry, 1100–1550 (Woodbridge: Boydell & Brewer, 2007), ISBN 978-184-383-292-8
- The Ultimate Experience: Battlefield Revelations and the Making of Modern War Culture, 1450–2000 (Houndmills: Palgrave-Macmillan, 2008), ISBN 978-023-058-388-7
- Sapiens: A Brief History of Humankind (London: Harvill Secker, 2014) ISBN 978-006-231-609-7
- Homo Deus: A Brief History of Tomorrow (2016), ISBN 978-1-910701-88-1
- Money: Vintage Minis (select excerpts from Sapiens and Homo Deus (London: Penguin Random House, 2018) ISBN 978-1-78487-402-5
- 21 Lessons for the 21st Century (London: Jonathan Cape, 2018), ISBN 1-78733-067-2
- Sapiens: A Graphic History, Volume 1 – The Birth of Humankind (London: Jonathan Cape, 2020)
- Sapiens: A Graphic History, Volume 2 − The Pillars of Civilization (London: Jonathan Cape, 2021)
- Sapiens: A Graphic History, Volume 3 − The Masters of History (London: Jonathan Cape, 2024)
- Unstoppable Us, Volume 1 − How Humans Took Over the World (Bright Matter Books, 2022), ISBN 0-593-64346-1
- Unstoppable Us, Volume 2 − Why the World Isn't Fair (Bright Matter Books, 2024), ISBN 9780593711521
- Unstoppable Us, Volume 3 − How Enemies Become Friends (Bright Matter Books, 2026), ISBN 9798217115686
- Nexus: A Brief History of Information Networks from the Stone Age to AI, (Fern Press, 2024), ISBN 978-1911717089
