= Julia Goodfellow =

British biophysicist & academic (born 1951)

Dame Julia Mary Goodfellow
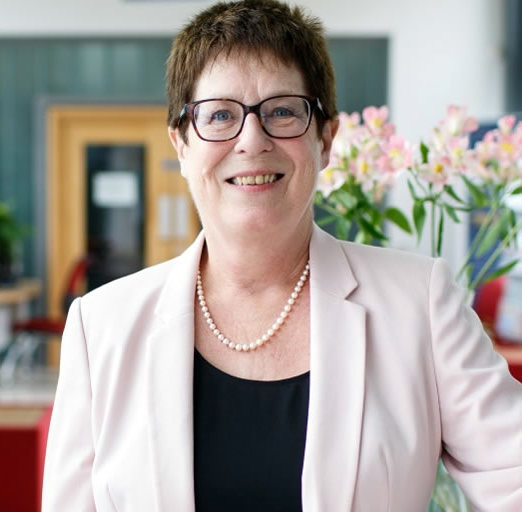
- Born: Julia Mary Lansdall; 1 July 1951 (age 75)
- Citizenship: UK
- Spouse: Peter Goodfellow
- Awards: DBE; FMedSci,
- Scientific career
- Workplaces: University of Bristol; University of Kent; Open University; Birkbeck, University of London
- Thesis: Structural studies of the corneal stroma (1975)
- Website: www.kent.ac.uk/about/vicechancellor/profile.html

Dame Julia Mary Goodfellow DBE FMedSci FInstP (née Lansdall; born 1 July 1951) is a former Vice-Chancellor of the University of Kent, and Chair of the British Science Association. She was the president of Universities UK from 1 August 2015 until July 2017.

== Early life, education and career ==
Goodfellow completed her BSc degree in physics at the University of Bristol and obtained a PhD degree in biophysics at the Open University Research Unit in Oxford. She began her career as Professor of Biomolecular Science at Birkbeck College in 1995, and was promoted to Vice Master in 1998. In 2002, she was appointed chief executive of the Biotechnology and Biological Sciences Research Council, the first woman to lead a UK research council. Goodfellow served as chair of the British Science Association from 2009 to 2014.

In 2007, she was appointed Vice-Chancellor of the University of Kent. In 2011, she was appointed to both the Council for Science and Technology and the Science and Technology Facilities Council. Currently, Goodfellow is a member of the Higher Education Policy Institute (Hepi) advisory board.

Goodfellow was elected Universities UK president from 2015 to 2017, the first woman to hold the role. In 2015 Goodfellow stated that Universities UK supported staying in the European Union, citing the “economic growth, employable graduates and cutting edge research discoveries” that the EU could provide in the education sector. In 2018 she became president of the Royal Society of Biology.

== Honours ==
- 2001: Appointed Commander of the Order of the British Empire (CBE)
- 2002: Honorary Doctor of Science (Hon DSc) degree from the University of Bristol
- 2002: Honorary Doctor of Science degree from the University of Strathclyde
- 2004: Doctor of the University (DUniv) degree from the University of Essex
- 2005: Honorary Doctor of Science degree from the University of Edinburgh
- 2005: Honorary Doctor of Science degree from Durham University
- 2009: Honorary Doctor of Science degree from the University of Manchester
- 2010: Promoted to Dame Commander of the Order of the British Empire (DBE) 'For services to Science'

== Personal life ==
In 1972, Julia Lansdall married Peter Goodfellow, with whom she has one daughter and one son.

== Criticism ==
Goodfellow has been criticised for her travel expenses and pay for the 2014-15 year. Her travel expenses were reported to be £26,635, with 92% of flights being first or business class. She also received a pay rise of 3% in the same year, increasing her salary to £272,000.

She received a £43,000 pay rise in 2012–13, a rise of 19%. Other staff at the university were striking to secure a 2% pay rise in the same year. The university was criticised by the University and College Union for attempting to "obscure key information" by obfuscating records of the meeting in which her salary was decided.

== Selected publications ==
- Goodfellow, J.; Winstanley, M. (2004). "Shaping the future in biology". Systems Biology. 1 (1): 6–7. PMID 17052110.
- MacDonald, J. T.; Purkiss, A. G.; Smith, M. A.; Evans, P.; Goodfellow, J. M.; Slingsby, C. (2005). "Unfolding crystallins: The destabilizing role of a β-hairpin cysteine in βB2-crystallin by simulation and experiment". Protein Science. 14 (5): 1282–1292. doi:10.1110/ps.041227805. PMC 2253261. PMID 15840832.
- Sy, D.; Gravier, Y.; Goodfellow, J.; Vovelle, F. (2003). "Protein stability and plasticity of the hydrophobic cavity in wheat ns-LTP". Journal of Biomolecular Structure & Dynamics. 21 (1): 15–29. doi:10.1080/07391102.2003.10506902. PMID 12854956. S2CID 42712897.
- Moraitakis, G.; Goodfellow, J. M. (2003). "Simulations of Human Lysozyme: Probing the Conformations Triggering Amyloidosis". Biophysical Journal. 84 (4): 2149–2158. Bibcode:2003BpJ....84.2149M. doi:10.1016/S0006-3495(03)75021-8. PMC 1302782. PMID 12668424.
- Beatty, E.; Zhong, W.; Kubal, G.; Houldershaw, D.; Goodfellow, J.; Sadler, P. (2002). "Histidine pK(a) values for the N-lobe of human transferrin: Effect of substitution of binding site Asp by Ser (D63S)". Journal of Inorganic Biochemistry. 88 (3–4): 403–409. doi:10.1016/S0162-0134(01)00352-X. PMID 11897357.
- Goodfellow, J. (2002). "Keeping focus on the science. Interview by Nigel Williams". Current Biology. 12 (3): R80–R81. doi:10.1016/s0960-9822(02)00663-2. PMID 11839282. S2CID 35371857.
- Purkiss, A. G.; Bateman, O.; Goodfellow, J.; Lubsen, N.; Slingsby, C. (2001). "The X-ray Crystal Structure of Human gamma S-crystallin C-terminal Domain". Journal of Biological Chemistry. 277 (6): 4199–4205. doi:10.1074/jbc.M110083200. PMID 11706012.

Government offices
Preceded by Ray Baker	CEO of the Biotechnology and Biological Sciences Research Council; 2002–2007	Succeeded by Douglas Kell
