= Jackie Hunter =

British scientist

- Born: Ann Jacqueline Hunter; 1956 (age 69–70)
- Education: Bedford College, London
- Known for: Open innovation; CEO of the BBSRC; Innovative Medicines Initiative; AI and Drug discovery
- Awards: CBE (2010); FBPharmacolS (2012); FMedSci (2014); FRSB (2016)
- Scientific career
- Workplaces: Board Director Benevolent AI; Formerly CEO at BenevolentBio, bioscience division of BenevolentAI; BBSRC; Proximagen; OI Pharma Partners; GlaxoSmithKline; Zoological Society of London; St George's, University of London
- Thesis: Chemical communication, aggression and sexual behaviour in the owl monkey (Aotus trivirgatus griseimembra) (1981)
- Website: benevolent.ai/blog/

Ann Jacqueline Hunter CBE FMedSci FBPharmacolS FRSB is a British scientist who is a board director of BenevolentAI. Hunter is also a visiting professor at St George's Hospital Medical School and Imperial College. She is Chair of the Trustees of the Sainsbury Laboratories at Norwich, chair of the board of the Stevenage Bioscience Catalyst and chair of the board of Brainomix. She was previously CEO of the Biotechnology and Biological Sciences Research Council.

== Education ==
Jackie Hunter was educated at Selwyn School, Matson, Gloucestershire and at the King's School, Gloucester. She achieved a BSc in Physiology and Psychology at Bedford College, University of London in 1977 and whilst there represented the college on the TV programme University Challenge in 1976. She was awarded her PhD for work carried out at London Zoo entitled 'Olfaction, aggression and sexual behaviour of owl monkeys (genus Aotus) in 1981.

== Career ==
Hunter undertook a Wellcome Trust Postdoctoral research fellowship at St George's Hospital Medical School before joining the pharmaceutical industry. She worked at Glaxo Laboratories first in Greenford and then Ware on novel therapeutics for Alzheimer's disease. In 1986 she moved to Astra and then subsequently in 1989 to SmithKline and French just prior to the merger that created SmithKlineBeecham (SB). At SB she held a number of management positions and was responsible for delivering a number of candidate molecules to development as well as large-scale external collaborations such as the ENU mutagenesis project with the MRC at Harwell. After the merger between SB and GlaxoWellcome to create GSK, she became head of the Neurology and GI Centre of Excellence for Drug Discovery and Site Head at the GSK site in Harlow, Essex.

In 2008, Hunter developed GSK's external innovation strategy and was responsible for developing the concept of the Stevenage Bioscience Catalyst and obtaining funding from government and other bodies. In 2010, she left GSK to establish OI Pharma Partners. which was established as a consultancy for the promotion of open innovation in the life sciences, working with governments, academic organisations and companies to formulate open innovation strategies and best practice.

In 2013, Hunter was appointed CEO of the BBSRC. She has also been a non-executive director of Proximagen group plc and Chiltern International Group (2016–present). She was a member of the governing councils of Royal Holloway and Bedford College, University of London and of Hertfordshire University. In 2016 she left the BBSRC and joined Stratified Medical which became BenevolentAI, establishing the drug discovery arm of the organisation. She retired from BenevolentAI in 2020 but remains as a board director. In 2019 she was appointed chair of the trustees of the Sainsbury Laboratories at Norwich. In 2020 she was also appointed as chair of the board of the Stevenage Bioscience Catalyst and chair of the board of Brainomix, an AI enabled imaging company.

== Awards ==
- 2010 – Women of Achievement in Science, Engineering and Technology (SET) awards in the category SET Discovery, Innovation and Entrepreneurship
- 2010 – CBE in Queen's Birthday Honours list for Services to the Pharmaceutical Industry
- 2012 – Fellow of the British Pharmacological Society (BPS)
- 2014 – Fellow of the Academy of Medical Sciences (FMedSci)
- 2014 – Named as one of 50 Movers and Shakers in Bio-Business 2014
- 2015 – Fellow of Zoological Society of London
- 2015 – British Pharmacological Society Astra Zeneca prize for Women in Pharmacology
- 2016 – Honorary DSc (Brunel University)
- 2016 – Fellow of the Royal Society of Biology
- 2017 – Honorary DSc University of East Anglia
- 2017 – Named by Forbes Magazine as one of the top 20 Women Globally Advancing AI research
- 2017 – Honorary Fellowship by British Pharmacological Society
- 2020 – Honorary DSc University of Sheffield
- 2020 – Honorary DSc Royal Holloway and Bedford College

Government offices
Preceded by Douglas Kell	Incumbent
