= Homo Deus: A Brief History of Tomorrow =

2015 book by Yuval Noah Harari

- First edition (Hebrew)
- Author: Yuval Noah Harari
- Original title: ההיסטוריה של המחר
- Language: English; Hebrew (original)
- Subject: Futures studies, social philosophy
- Publisher: Harvill Secker
- Publication date: 2015
- Publication place: Israel
- English publication date: 8 September 2016
- Pages: 448
- ISBN: 978-191-070-187-4
- Preceded by: Sapiens: A Brief History of Humankind
- Followed by: 21 Lessons for the 21st Century

Homo Deus: A Brief History of Tomorrow (Hebrew: ההיסטוריה של המחר (Romanised: hahistoria shel hamachar), English: The History of the Tomorrow) is a book written by Israeli author Yuval Noah Harari, professor at the Hebrew University of Jerusalem. The book was first published in Hebrew in 2015 by Dvir publishing; the English-language version was published in September 2016 in the United Kingdom and in February 2017 in the United States.

As with its predecessor, Sapiens: A Brief History of Humankind, Harari recounts the course of human history while describing events and the individual human experience, along with ethical issues in relation to his historical survey. However, Homo Deus (from Latin "Homo" meaning man or human and "Deus" meaning God) deals more with the abilities acquired by humans (Homo sapiens) throughout their existence, and their evolution as the dominant species in the world. The book describes mankind's current abilities and achievements and attempts to paint an image of the future. Many philosophical issues are discussed, such as humanism, individualism, transhumanism, and mortality.

== Summary ==
The book sets out to examine possibilities of the future of Homo sapiens. The premise outlines that during the 21st century, humanity is likely to make a significant attempt to gain happiness, immortality, and God-like powers. Throughout the book, Harari openly speculates various ways that this ambition might be realised in the future based on the past and present. The book focuses as well on humanism, religion and capitalism and compares the two throughout the book.

=== Homo sapiens conquers the world ===
- The first part of the book explores the relationship between humans and other animals, exploring what led to the former's dominance over the latter.
- Harari speculates as well why homo sapiens and not neanderthals rule the world.

=== Homo sapiens gives meaning to the world ===
- Since the language revolution some 70,000 years ago, humans have lived within an "intersubjective reality", such as countries, borders, religion, money and companies, all created to enable large-scale, flexible cooperation between different individual human beings. Humanity is separated from other animals by humans' ability to believe in these intersubjective constructs that exist only in the human mind and are given force through collective belief.
- Humankind's immense ability to give meaning to its actions and thoughts is what has enabled its many achievements.
- Harari argues that humanism is a form of religion that worships humankind instead of a god. It puts humankind and its desires as a top priority in the world, in which humans themselves are framed as the dominant beings. Humanists believe that ethics and values are derived internally within each individual, rather than from an external source. During the 21st century, Harari believes that humanism may push humans to search for immortality, happiness, and power.
- The book explores three different kinds of humanism including socialist humanism, evolutionary humanism and liberal humanism. Harari discusses their advantages as well as their impact on society throughout history and explores their core doctrines and ideology. Harari speculates about various theories why different kinds of humanism have conquered the world throughout the last centuries and compares them in various aspects to religion.
- Hararis concludes that humanism is "the leading world religion" because humanism is flexible and adapts itself to new inventions and changes in society. The book states that religion has lost influence throughout previous centuries because religion tries to solve problems and answer questions by looking for the answer in holy scripts, whereas humanism in comparison would solve problems through science, research and innovation.

=== Homo sapiens loses control ===
- Technological developments have threatened the continued ability of humans to give meaning to their lives; Harari suggests the possibility of the replacement of humankind with the super-man, or "homo deus" (human god) endowed with abilities such as eternal life.
- The last chapter suggests the possibility that humans are algorithms, and as such Homo sapiens may not be dominant in a universe where big data becomes a paradigm. As humans absorb more data, they become more algorithmic and more efficient at processing data, which gives humans deeper emotions and superior intellectual abilities. However, the rapidly growing data may ultimately consume humans in the sense that nothing that originally made us human is left, and make humans obsolete.
- The book closes with the following question addressed to the reader:
  "What will happen to society, politics and daily life when non-conscious but highly intelligent algorithms know us better than we know ourselves?"

== Awards and honors ==
- Time magazine listed Homo Deus as one of its top ten non-fiction books of 2017.
- Wellcome longlisted Homo Deus for their 2017 Book Prize.

== Reception ==
Homo Deus was reviewed or discussed in The New York Times, The Guardian, The Economist, The New Yorker, NPR, Financial Times, and Times Higher Education.

Steve Aoki's song "Homo Deus" on the album Neon Future IV is named after the book and features Harari's narration of the audiobook.

Writing in The Guardian, David Runciman praised the book's originality and style, although he suggested that it lacked empathy for Homo sapiens. The review points out that "Harari cares about the fate of animals in a human world but he writes about the prospects for Homo sapiens in a data-driven world with a lofty insouciance." He also added: "Harari would probably be the first to admit, it's [the book] only intelligent by human standards, which are nothing special. By the standards of the smartest machines it’s woolly and speculative." Runciman nonetheless gave the book a generally positive review.

In a mixed review, The Economist called Homo Deus "a glib work, full of corner-cutting sleights of hand and unsatisfactory generalisations" and stated that "Mr Harari has a tendency towards scientific name-dropping—words like biotech, nanotechnology and artificial intelligence abound—but he rarely engages with these topics in any serious way."

Writing in the Journal of Evolution and Technology, Allan McCay has challenged Harari's claims about human algorithmic agency.

== Translations ==
Translations include:

- English: September 2016
- Spanish: October 2016
- Catalan: October 2016
- Portuguese: November 2016
- Turkish: December 2016
- Chinese: January 2017
- German: February 2017 (by Andreas Wirthensohn)
- Dutch: February 2017
- Hungarian: April 2017
- Croatian: May 2017
- Italian: May 2017, Bompiani
- Korean: May 2017
- Finnish: September 2017
- French: September 2017
- Norwegian: 2017, Bazar
- Greek: December 2017
- Czech: December 2017
- Danish: August 2017
- Slovene: 2017, 2019
- Lithuanian: February 2018
- Persian: March 2018
- Romanian: March 2018
- Russian: March 2018
- Bulgarian: April 2018
- Polish: April 2018
- Ukrainian: May 2018
- Albanian: June 2018
- Vietnamese: July 2018
- Japanese: September 2018
- Serbian: September 2018
- Indonesian: May 2018
- Marathi: November 2018
- Slovak: 2019
- Thai: September 2019
- Macedonian: 2019
- Urdu: 2019
- Tamil : 2019
- Mongolian: 2020
- Malayalam: 2020
- Arabic: November 2021

== See also ==
- Sapiens: A Brief History of Humankind
- 21 Lessons for the 21st Century
