= Raymond Baker (chemist) =

British scientist, former Chief of BBSRC (born 1936)

Ray Baker
- Born: 1 November 1936 (age 89)
- Education: University of Leicester
- Awards: CBE (2002); PhD; Fellow of the Royal Society (1994)
- Scientific career
- Fields: Organic chemistry
- Workplaces: University of California, Los Angeles; University of Southampton; University of Leicester; Merck Sharp & Dohme Research Labs; BBSRC
- Thesis: Detritiation Reactions in Aromatic Systems (1962)

Raymond Baker CBE FRS (born 1 November 1936) is a British chemist and former Chief Executive of the Biotechnology and Biological Sciences Research Council.

== Education ==
Baker was educated at Ilkeston Grammar School and the University of Leicester, where he gained his PhD for research titled "Detritiation Reactions in Aromatic Systems" in 1962.

== Career ==
After completing his PhD, Baker did postdoctoral research at UCLA from 1962–64. He was appointed a lecturer in Organic Chemistry at the University of Southampton in 1964, Reader in 1974 and a Professor in 1977. Baker is a co-author of the textbook Mechanism in Organic Chemistry.

== Awards ==
Baker was elected a Fellow of the Royal Society in 1994 and Commander of the Most Excellent Order of the British Empire (CBE) in 2002.

Government offices
Preceded by Tom Blundell	CEO of the Biotechnology and Biological Sciences Research Council; 1996–2001	Succeeded by Julia Goodfellow
