= Resia Pretorius =

South African scientist

- Citizenship: South Africa
- Education: Stellenbosch University(BSc and MSc), University of Pretoria(PhD)
- Occupations: Academic, researcher
- Employer: Stellenbosch University
- Title: Professor
- Awards: African Union Kwame Nkrumah Scientific Awards for the Southern Region in the Basic Science, Technology and Innovation Sector

Etheresia Pretorius is a South African scientist. She is Distinguished Professor and head of the Department of Physiological Sciences at Stellenbosch University. Her research deals with coagulation in a variety of medical conditions including type 2 diabetes, chronic fatigue syndrome, Alzheimer's, Parkinson's, COVID-19 and Long COVID.

== Education ==
Pretorius earned a BScHons (cum laude) and MSc from Stellenbosch University, then a PhD from the University of Pretoria in 1998.

== Career ==
Following her doctorate, Pretorius became a lecturer in the Department of Anatomy at the University of Pretoria, and later joined the Department of Physiology. She now works at Stellenbosch University, where she is Distinguished Professor and head of the Department of Physiological Sciences.

Her research deals with coagulation in a variety of medical conditions including type 2 diabetes, chronic fatigue syndrome, Alzheimer's, Parkinson's, COVID-19 and Long COVID. Her 2021 study was the first to propose microclots could play a role in Long COVID. She often collaborates with biochemist Douglas Kell and they led the first team to visualize microclots in Long COVID.

According to Scopus, Pretorius has an h-index of 45. In 2011, she won the African Union Kwame Nkrumah Scientific Awards for the Southern Region in the Basic Science, Technology and Innovation Sector.
