= New Frontiers Science Park =

- PHE Harlow
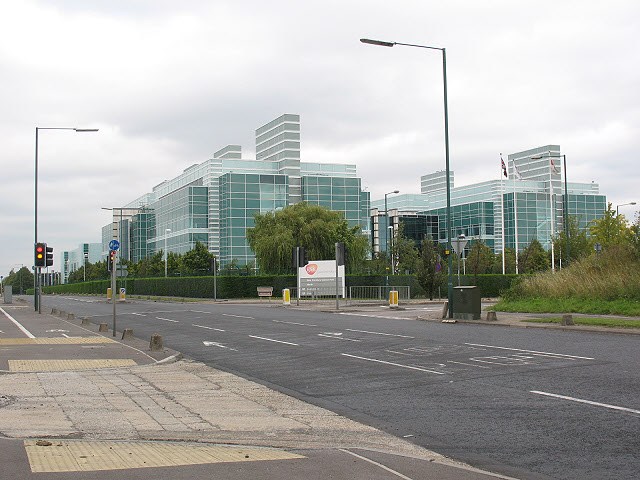
- Seen in August 2009

- Location within Essex
- Former names: GSK Harlow

General information
- Type: Science park, former research centre
- Location: Pinnacles Industrial Estate, Harlow, Essex, CM19 5AD
- Coordinates: 51.7659°N 0.0693°E
- Elevation: 65 m (213 ft)
- Construction started: September 1994
- Completed: April 1997
- Inaugurated: 28 April 1997
- Cost: £250m
- Client: SmithKline Beecham Pharmaceuticals
- Owner: Public Health England

Dimensions
- Other dimensions: 18.53 hectares

Design and construction
- Main contractor: LMK Joint Venture (Laing)

The New Frontiers Science Park is a science park in Harlow, Essex, on a redeveloped research site of GlaxoSmithKline (GSK).

== History ==
Beecham Research Laboratories opened a 4-acre site around October 1969, with 80 staff. By 1988 there were 430 staff. In 1971 Beecham Group tried to take over Glaxo; it became SmithKline Beecham in 1989. Beecham bought the former Ohmeda site in Harlow from BOC in November 1988. New buildings were added by SmithKline Beecham in 1990. The main Beecham headquarters, Beecham House, was in Brentford, Middlesex; the current GSK headquarters is the former Beecham headquarters.

Beecham built a penicillin plant in Worthing, West Sussex, in the early 1960s. Beecham had another large research site at Betchworth, Surrey. Merck & Co. built its nearby Neuroscience Research Centre in 1984.

=== Construction ===
Outline planning application was discussed in a Harlow district council meeting on Tuesday 8 June 1993, with twelve animal rights protesters at the meeting. The site would be 878,000 square feet. Two Essex Police officers were asked to attend the meeting, as it was a known 'sensitive issue'. At first, during the meeting, the animal rights individuals were even-tempered, and held no obvious open hostility to the district councillors present; or so it may have seemed. But when the Labour district councillors voted to allow the development to be built, the animal rights individuals soon lost their temper, and vindictively promised 'huge protests' against the proposed development, generously describing SmithKline Beecham as 'bloody murderers'.

Full construction plans were submitted on Tuesday 19 July 1994, with final planning permission being given in early September 1994, with construction starting soon afterwards.

On Thursday 16 March 1995, 43 year old carpenter Dennis Gough, of Enfield, fell 30 feet off scaffolding. He was taken to the Princess Alexandra Hospital, but died in the early hours of the next day.

Construction would be finished by November 1996. Further work would take around one year, to make the interior a sterile environment. The site was built by LMK Joint Venture (Laing Management and Morrison–Knudsen). The same joint venture LMK would later build the Pfizer Campus in Kent.

=== Opening ===
George Poste was the chief science and technology officer of the company. There were two buildings - Science Complex One, to the north, and Pharmaceutical Technologies, to the south. Th inauguration took place on Monday 28 April 1997, with around 500 guests, including Martin Bangemann from the European Commission.

=== SmithKline Beecham ===
Smith, Kline & French had been headquartered in Welwyn Garden City; it merged with Beecham Group in 1989. Smith Kline & French Research had a research site at Welwyn Garden City and another at The Frythe in rural Hertfordshire in the south of Welwyn; in the early 1980s all research was moved out of Welwyn Garden City to The Frythe.

The site was built by SmithKline Beecham, which became GSK in December 2000 when it merged with Glaxo Wellcome. The site was the UK headquarters of SmithKline Beecham; Glaxo had a takeover of Wellcome in 1995. SmithKline Beecham employed 47,000 staff around the world, with 8,200 in the UK. Jan Leschly (a Danish tennis player) was chief executive of SmithKline Beecham from 1994 to 2000. SmithKline Beecham exported £1.2bn of products. In 1998, SmithKline Beecham spent £910m on research, with £330m of that in the UK.

Beecham Pharmaceuticals previously had its Medicinal Research Centre on the site., where it worked on hypertension and gastrointestinal disease.

The site was visited by the Princess Royal on the afternoon of 3 February 2000, following on in the morning from attending a meeting about the new Basic Skills Agency.

=== GSK ===
SmithKline Beecham became GSK. After the merger, a possibility was that the Harlow site would close or Glaxo Wellcome's Glaxo Research Campus in Stevenage would close; at the time of its construction in the early 1990s, Glaxo Stevenage was the largest single construction site in the UK. At the time of the merger, the USA was accounting for 45% of GSK's sales, with 33% in Europe, and 22% in the rest of the world. The company would be the world's largest pharmaceutical company with a market capitalisation of £114bn. GSK was the largest private sector funder of research in the UK.

=== Research ===
Working with the University of Cambridge, in 2000 a team gave mice a human gene that made the protein UCP3, that was found on the human Chromosome 11. The genetically engineered mice never became overweight, no matter what the mice ate.

=== 2012 Summer Olympics ===
The site was the Official Laboratory Services Provider for the 2012 Summer Olympics; every medallist and 50% of competitors were tested by GSK there. 150 scientists from King's College London and the World Anti-Doping Agency would be there, to take around 6,000 samples. 240 prohibited substances would be tested for, with about 400 samples per day. By April 2017, 29 medals had been stripped from competitors in the 2012 Olympics, with 13 of these from Russia.

=== Public Health England ===
Since 2010, the Health Protection Agency had wanted to move scientific staff to the GSK site in Essex. GSK had proposed to move from the site in February 2010.

Public Health England bought the site on 7 July 2017 for £25m. Staff will move to the site in 2021, and it will be fully operational by 2024. PHE is headed by Duncan Selbie.

== Structure ==
It is situated in Essex on the A1169, over which the site has a footbridge.

=== Heads of site ===
- Jackie Hunter CBE

== See also ==
- Alderley Park, former site of ICI, later AstraZeneca
- BioCity Nottingham
- Lilly Research Centre
