= Stephen Oliver (scientist) =

Steve Oliver FMedSci
- Born: Stephen George Oliver; 3 November 1949 (age 76)
- Education: University of Bristol
- Known for: Robot Scientist; Systems Biology
- Awards: EMBO member (2004); FAAAS (2008)
- Scientific career
- Workplaces: University of Manchester Institute of Science and Technology; University of Cambridge; University of Kent; University of Manchester; University of California, Irvine; National Institute for Medical Research
- Thesis: The role of RNA in the maintenance of mitochondrial DNA in the yeast, Saccharomyces cerevisiae. (1975)
- Website: www.bioc.cam.ac.uk/research/oliver

Stephen George Oliver (born 3 November 1949) is a British scientist who is an Emeritus Professor in the Department of Biochemistry at the University of Cambridge, and a Fellow of Wolfson College, Cambridge.

== Education ==
Oliver was educated at the University of Bristol gaining a Bachelor of Science degree in Microbiology in 1971 followed by a PhD from the National Institute for Medical Research (NIMR) in 1974.

== Research ==
Oliver's areas of research include functional genomics, systems biology and drug discovery using the model organism Saccharomyces cerevisiae which he has worked on since the 1970s. In 1992, whilst working at UMIST, Oliver led the team which provided first complete sequence analysis of an entire chromosome from any organism. More recently he has also been involved in the creation of a Robot Scientist and has been awarded research funding as principal investigator or co-investigator with a total value of over £26 million by the Biotechnology and Biological Sciences Research Council (BBSRC).

Oliver was elected a Fellow of the Academy of Medical Sciences in 2002.
