= Our Political Nature =

Book by Avi Tuschman

- Author: Avi Tuschman
- Language: English
- Publisher: Prometheus Books
- Publication date: 2013

Our Political Nature: The Evolutionary Origins of What Divides Us is a 2013 book by Avi Tuschman. It proposed an evolutionary theory of human political orientation. The book theorizes that political leanings are evolutionary adaptations that arise primarily from three clusters of measurable personality traits: tribalism, tolerance of inequality, and perceptions of human nature. As evidence, Our Political Nature synthesizes studies from the fields of political science, genetics, neuroscience, and primatology. The book also offers a psychological explanation for why economic stress tends to broaden the divide between political factions.

== Reception ==
Chris Mooney in The Washington Monthly credited the book with "explaining the now well-documented psychological, biological, and genetic differences between liberals and conservatives with reference to human evolution and the differential strategies of mate choice and resource allocation that have been forced on us by the pressures of surviving and reproducing on a quite dangerous planet." John R. Hibbing in Political Science Quarterly reported that although the book was one of several published at the same time dealing with psychological, biological and evolutionary bases of political beliefs, it "makes a unique and important contribution to the field" and noted that with regard to its discussion of evolution in the context of politics, "as selection pressures are relaxed, it may be possible to push it too far." An unattributed review in The Economist described Tuschman as a biological determinist and said the book did not explain the unpredictability of voters in the middle ground, commenting: "the author’s efforts to use “hard science” to illuminate partisanship often run aground... The political world Mr Tuschman describes tends to be remarkably binary and easily classifiable." In Forbes, Cedric Muhammad noted that the book was generally rejected by conservatives and embraced by liberals, criticized its discussion of ethnocentrism, yet said it makes "a compelling case that we are hard-wired to be liberal or conservative by nature, environment and adaptation."

== Author ==
Avi Tuschman is an American evolutionary anthropologist and author. Tuschman attended high school at Menlo School in California. He attended Stanford University He graduated in 2002 and relocated to Peru for his first job after college. Tuschman later returned to Stanford for a Ph.D. in evolutionary anthropology.

In Peru, Tuschman worked as a speech writer and political adviser to President Alejandro Toledo, and served as international projects coordinator for Toledo’s Global Center for Development and Democracy.
