= Nexus: A Brief History of Information Networks from the Stone Age to AI =

2024 non-fiction book by Yuval Noah Harari

- Cover of the first edition (2024, Fern Press)
- Author: Yuval Noah Harari
- Language: English
- Subject: History, information networks, technology
- Genre: Non-fiction
- Publisher: Penguin Random House
- Publication date: 10 September 2024
- Publication place: United Kingdom
- Media type: Print, e-book, audiobook
- Pages: 528
- ISBN: 978-1-911717-08-9
- Website: Official page

Nexus: A Brief History of Information Networks from the Stone Age to AI is a 2024 non-fiction book by Israeli historian and philosopher Yuval Noah Harari. Published in the United Kingdom by Fern Press, an imprint of Penguin Random House, the book surveys the history of information networks and their influence on human societies, from early oral traditions to modern artificial intelligence (AI).

== Summary ==
The book explains the nature of human information networks and how artificial intelligence works. It examines the strategies and technologies humans have used or use for effective communication in both past and contemporary times. It states that the first impactful information technology was the story - regardless of its truth; the story applied to all religions and sociopolitical beliefs, and formed the basis of most art and mythology. Harari writes that a "tsunami" of false or misleading information can supersede facts in people's judgement, citing the period of witch hunting. Harari claims that it would be "naive" to think that information would make humanity more powerful as a direct consequence of gaining it, and that truth does not imply success; only the story conveyed matters in terms of success. He has been criticized by experts in the field for this view.

=== Criticism of AI ===
Nexus states that AI has several problems. Harari broadly identifies two of these problems being the "alien" way of thinking performed by an AI model, and the "alignment problem", where AI systems intentionally or unintentionally forego human needs. As an example, he mentions the program AlphaGo which, he states, thinks in unknown manners, making moves which master Go players would fail to understand. Harari states that the capability of artificial intelligence to think and make decisions could cause catastrophe.

=== Self-correcting systems ===
Harari differentiates significantly between self-correcting and non-self-correcting systems. Science and democracy, he explains, are self-correcting, while totalitarianism and religion are not. He argues that artificial intelligence, despite its capability of learning, is not self-correcting if it supersedes other sources because of its inability to learn what it does not know.

== Critical review ==
The book has received reviews by critics and academics writing in The Guardian, California Review of Books and the journal AI & Society. The Guardian writes that it "offers a penetrating critique of the insidious dangers of machine learning and its capacity to manipulate the truth", but "has some curious blind spots", such as there being little mention of capitalism. Manik Konch, writing in AI & Society, states that "the book offers a sweeping analysis of the evolution of information systems and their transformative impact on humanity", with "striking" examples, such as GPT-4 bypassing a captcha by making a human (reached via a website providing human assistants) think that the AI was a human with a vision impairment, thus needing assistance with the CAPTCHA.
