= Christopher Robert Hallpike =

English-Canadian anthropologist (1938–2026)

- Born: 19 April 1938
- Died: 26 June 2026 (aged 88)
- Education: University of Oxford (BLitt, MA, PhD, D.Litt)
- Scientific career
- Workplaces: Dalhousie University; McMaster University

Christopher Robert Hallpike (19 April 1938 – 26 June 2026) was an English-Canadian anthropologist and a professor of anthropology at McMaster University, Ontario, Canada. He was known for his extensive study of the Konso of Ethiopia and Tauade of New Guinea.

== Early life and education ==
Hallpike was educated at Clifton College, and The Queen's College, Oxford, where he read PPE. After graduation he studied at the Institute of Social Anthropology, Oxford, under E. E. Evans-Pritchard and Rodney Needham. Fieldwork among the Konso in Ethiopia 1965–1967 was followed by a D.Phil. in 1968.

== Career ==
After graduation, Hallpike was appointed a postdoctoral fellow at Dalhousie University, Nova Scotia, and in 1970–1972 carried out fieldwork among the Tauade of Papua New Guinea. He returned to Dalhousie as a research associate in 1972–1973, and after four years in England as a private researcher, in 1978 was appointed professor of anthropology at McMaster University, Ontario, until retiring in 1998 as professor emeritus. He became a Canadian citizen in 1982. Hallpike was a Bye Fellow of Robinson College, Cambridge, in 1984–1985, 1988–1989, and 1992, and was awarded a D.Litt. by Oxford University in 1989.

== Research ==
Hallpike researched and published on a wide range of subjects, including Ethiopia and Papua New Guinea; stateless societies; tribal warfare; systems of seniority based on age; the symbolism of hair style; sociocultural evolution; cultural materialism; Piaget, developmental psychology and primitive thought; the evolution of morality; the relevance of Darwinism and sociobiology in anthropology (especially the weaknesses of adaptationism); and the history of science.

He was critical of "journalists, science writers, historians, linguists, biologists, and especially evolutionary psychologists" who write about primitive societies with ignorance or even ideologically driven falsifications espousing theories that are "nonsense." Thus, in his book Ship of Fools he is critical of the theories presented by Emma Byrne about swearing, Yuval Harari about human history, Rene Girard about mimetic causation of violence, William Arens about his denial of human cannibalism, and Noam Chomsky about universal grammar in language acquisition.

== Death ==
Hallpike died on 26 June 2026, at the age of 88.

== Publications ==
- The Konso of Ethiopia (Oxford: Clarendon Press,1972)
- Bloodshed and Vengeance in the Papuan Mountains (Oxford: Clarendon Press, 1977)
- The Foundations of Primitive Thought (Oxford: Clarendon Press, 1979)
- The Principles of Social Evolution (Oxford: Clarendon Press, 1986)
- The Evolution of Moral Understanding (Prometheus Research Group, 2004).
- How We Got Here: from bows and arrows to the space age (AuthorHouse UK, 2008)
- On Primitive Society, and Other Forbidden Topics (Bloomington, Indiana: AuthorHouse, 2011)
- Do We Need God to Be Good? (Kouvola, Finland: Castalia House, 2016)
- Ethical Thought in Increasingly Complex Societies (Lexington Books, 2017)
- Ship of Fools: An anthology of learned nonsense about primitive society (Castalia House, 2018)
- Darwinism, Dogma, and Cultural Evolution (Castalia House, May 2020)
- On The Wilder Shores Of Life: Living With Primitive Tribes (Ellie White, 2021)
- Savagery and Civilisation (Ellie White, 2022)

=== Fiction ===
Two satirical novels under the pen name of “Owen Stanley"

- The Missionaries (Castalia House. 2016)
- The Promethean (Castalia House. 2017)
