= Emma Byrne (author) =

British writer and scientist

- Education: University College London
- Occupations: Writer and scientist

Emma Byrne is a contemporary British writer and scientist, working in the fields of swearing, artificial intelligence and robotics.

== Career ==
=== Scientist ===
Byrne completed her PhD in expectation violation analysis at the University College London, (UCL0, Department of Computer Science in 2005. Her work showed how it is possible to automatically identify and rank unexpected, and therefore interesting, news from the large volumes of news are available around the clock and around the world.

She later worked at the University of Aberystwyth as part of a team that created a robot scientist. This robot used artificial intelligence to generate functional genomics hypotheses about the yeast Saccharomyces cerevisiae and experimentally tested these hypotheses by using laboratory automation. During this time, she also won the British Computer Society AI group's annual machine intelligence award.

As part of her work in medical informatics, she studied the introduction of the summary care record, a centrally stored, shared electronic patient record and made recommendations about the implementation of large scale information technology projects in health care.

In 2025, in recognition of her research into the science of swearing and commitment to science communication, she was awarded the Rosalind Franklin Lecture Medal by Humanists UK.

=== Writer ===
Byrne has written about science, business and culture for Wired, the FT, The Guardian and many others.

Her first book was a popular science book called Swearing is Good for You, published in 2017. The book outlines the science behind swearing: how it affects us both physically and emotionally, and how it is natural and beneficial. She concludes that often, including swear words in our language can actually help us gain credibility and establish a sense of camaraderie. The book has been described as "entertaining and often enlightening" and has been translated into multiple languages.

Her second book is called How to Build a Human: What Science Knows About Childhood. This reviews what science can teach about childhood and Byrne suggests that parents can adopt the methods of science to help raise their children. This includes focusing on the variance, as well as the average, of behaviours and characteristics, rather than following prescriptive instructions for parenthood.

=== Media and events ===
As an expert in swearing, robotics and artificial intelligence, Byrne has made numerous appearances on Sky News, BBC news and radio, and at science festivals and literary festivals. She was featured in the documentary "Holy F***" presented by Ardal O'Hanlon on RTE One, where she discussed gender differences in swearing.
