= Emerald Cloud Lab =

Biotech company

- Type: Private
- Predecessor: Emerald Therapeutics
- Founded: 2010; 16 years ago
- Founder: D.J. Kleinbaum; Brian Frezza
- Headquarters: South San Francisco, California, United States
- Website: emeraldcloudlab.com

Emerald Cloud Lab (ECL) is a privately owned biotech startup. The company focuses on advancing laboratory virtualization, for chemistry and biotechnology, by building the first fully functional cloud lab, allowing scientists to conduct all of their wet lab research without being in a physical laboratory.

== Products and services ==
ECL is a remote-access laboratory that allows scientists to conduct experiments via the internet. Scientists ship samples to an ECL facility and design their experiments in the ECL Command Center software application. ECL Command Center is a fully integrated application, where experiments are encoded in a language and grammar designed by ECL to allow remote operation and ensure reproducibility. ECL remotely conducts experiments in a automated ECL facility exactly to the scientist's specifications. While conducting the experiments, the lab operators follow the instructions provided to them by Engine, the company's inventory management and experimental operations software, which the operators sometimes jokingly refer to as "Eugene". The platform collects and organizes all data generated by and relevant to experiments into a knowledge graph. ECL Command Center's extensive suite of tools can then be used to plot, analyze, and visualize results.

== History ==
=== Founding ===
Emerald Therapeutics was founded in 2010 by D.J. Kleinbaum and Brian Frezza in an effort to develop "antiviral therapeutics for diseases such as HPV and HIV". During this time, they experienced frustrations with laboratory hardware and software. Hardware often comes from disparate manufacturers, software is often rudimentary, and output can vary in formatting. To simplify laboratory testing, the group wrote centralized management software for the different machines and a database to store all metadata and results. This "laboratory operating system" continued to expand in capabilities, including the ability to directly control instrumentation and manage inventory and procurement. Recognizing the value this type of system presented outside of their own development goals, Kleinbaum and Frezza launched this service in 2014 under the name Emerald Cloud Lab. In 2016, Emerald Cloud Lab and Emerald Therapeutics were spun off from one another, and both are independent corporations.

=== Business development ===
As of 2014, Emerald Cloud Lab offered access to 40 types of laboratory instruments. By 2017, the range of instruments had expanded to 106. As of July 2020, Emerald Cloud Lab offered full control of over 150 laboratory instruments, with plans to expand capabilities outlined through 2021.

Researchers and pharmaceutical groups have long been concerned about the lack of reproducibility of laboratory testing in the biomedical field. A 2017 literature analysis article posited that highly automated, internet connected labs like ECL could ameliorate the problem. The paper concludes that, "we believe that robotic labs can provide the basis for performing a large percentage of basic biomedical research in a reproducible and transparent fashion". Frezza has described this laboratory inconsistency as one specific reason for the development of Emerald Cloud Lab and the use of automation.

== Financing ==
After spinning out of Emerald Therapeutics, the company has gone on to raise capital in multiple rounds. Key investors include Founders Fund, Schooner Capital, OS Fund, Alcazar Capital, Western Technology Investment, Sound Ventures, SciFi VC, Incite Ventures, and Spike Ventures.

The business got its second round of funding by 2014 from the Founders Fund (FF), a venture capital firm founded by Peter Thiel, bringing total funding raised from FF up to $13.5 million. The first FF funding round was not public.
