= Masahide Sasaki =

Japanese chemist

Masahide Sasaki (August 27, 1933 – September 23, 2005) was a Japanese chemist. He developed the first fully-automated laboratory, and he popularized this innovation internationally.

== Personal life ==
Masahide was born in Yamaguchi Prefecture of Japan on August 27, 1933. He married his wife, Tokyo, and had three children, Mika, Kyoko, and Masanori. He died of cancer on September 23, 2005.

== Career ==
As noted in his obituary in Clinical Chemistry, Masahide "graduated from Yamaguchi Medical School in 1961. During 1965, he served as an internist for the Hiroshima Atomic Bomb Casualty Committee. Several years later, in 1967, he was appointed the Chief of the Clinical Chemistry Department at Kawasaki Hospital. In 1970, he did a fellowship in the United States at the Michael Reese Hospital in Chicago, IL, which gave him exposure to the US medical system. Two years later he became an Assistant Professor of Internal Medicine at Kawasaki Medical School and rose quickly in the academic ranks to become a Full Professor of Laboratory Diagnosis in 1976 and, ultimately, Vice President of Kawasaki Paramedical College." He was appointed Professor and Director of the Department of the Clinical Laboratory at Kochi Medical School, Kochi, Japan in 1981. There, he developed his automation system.

Masahide published many papers between 1981 and 1999, the most notable of which was a monograph on laboratory automation sponsored by the A&T Corporation.

== Automation development ==
Masahide provided the first and most prominent example of a totally automated laboratory.
