= Biotechnology and Biological Sciences Research Council =

Public UK Research Council on Life Sciences

Council overview
- Formed: 1994; 31 years ago
- Status: Council within UK Research and Innovation
- Headquarters: Swindon, Wiltshire, England
- Annual budget: £322 million (FY2024/25)
- Ministers responsible: Liz Kendall MP, Secretary of State for Science, Innovation and Technology; Patrick Vallance, Minister of State for Science, Research and Innovation
- Council executives: Martin Humphries, Council Chair; Anne Ferguson-Smith, Executive Chair
- Parent department: Department for Science, Innovation and Technology
- Parent body: UK Research and Innovation
- Website: bbsrc.ukri.org

The Biotechnology and Biological Sciences Research Council (BBSRC), is a council of UK Research and Innovation (UKRI), a non-departmental public body sponsored by the Department for Science, Innovation and Technology. It is the largest UK public funder of non-medical bioscience. It predominantly funds scientific research institutes and university research departments in the UK.

== Purpose ==
Receiving its funding through the science budget of the Department for Science, Innovation and Technology, BBSRC's mission is to "promote and support, by any means, high-quality basic, strategic and applied research and related postgraduate training relating to the understanding and exploitation of biological systems".

== Structure ==
BBSRC's head office is at Polaris House in Swindon - the same building as the other councils of UK Research and Innovation, AHRC EPSRC, ESRC, Innovate UK, MRC, NERC, Research England and STFC, as well as the UKSA. Funded by Government, BBSRC invested over £498 million in bioscience in 2017–18. BBSRC also manages the joint Research Councils' Office in Brussels – the UK Research Office (UKRO).

== History ==
BBSRC was created in 1994, merging the former Agricultural and Food Research Council (AFRC) and taking over the biological science activities of the former Science and Engineering Research Council (SERC).

Chairs

- Sir Alistair Grant (1994–1998)
- Dr Peter Doyle (1998–2003)
- Dr Peter Ringrose (2003–2009)
- Prof Sir Tom Blundell (2009–2015)
- Prof Sir Gordon Duff (2015–present)

Chief executives

- Prof (now Sir) Tom Blundell (1994–1996)
- Prof Ray Baker (1996–2002)
- Prof (now Dame) Julia Goodfellow (2002–2007)
- Prof Douglas Kell (2008–2013)
- Dr Jackie Hunter (from 21 October 2013)
- Prof Melanie Welham (2016–2018)

Executive chairs

- Prof Melanie Welham (2018–2023)
- Prof Guy Poppy (2023–2024)
- Prof Anne Ferguson-Smith (2024–) (from 1 July 2024)

== Governance and management ==
BBSRC is managed by the BBSRC Council consisting of a chair (Professor Martin Humphries), an executive chair (Professor Guy Poppy) and from ten to eighteen representatives from UK universities, government and industry. The council approves policies, strategy, budgets and major funding.

A research panel provides expert advice which BBSRC Council draws upon in making decisions. The purpose of the research panel is to advise on:

- the development and implementation of the council's strategic plans
- the competitiveness, relevance, economic impact, and societal considerations of the science and innovation activities funded by BBSRC
- opportunities for partnership with national and international organisations

=== Boards, panels and committees ===
In addition to the council and the research panel, BBSRC has a series of other internal bodies for specific purposes.

- Appointments Board
- Remuneration Board
- Strategy Advisory Panels – eight panels advise and report to the BBSRC Executive Chair
- Research Committees – five committees award research grants in specific science areas

== Institutes ==
BBSRC strategically funds eight research institutes in the UK, and a number of centres.

They have strong links with business, industry and the wider community, and support policy development.

The institutes' research underpins key sectors of the UK economy such as agriculture, bioenergy, biotechnology, food and drink and pharmaceuticals. In addition, the institutes maintain unique research facilities of national importance.

- Babraham Institute (BI) (Cambridge)
- Earlham Institute (EI) (formerly The Genome Analysis Centre) (Norwich)
- The Institute of Biological, Environmental and Rural Sciences (IBERS), part of Aberystwyth University (Aberystwyth)
- John Innes Centre (JIC) (Norwich)
- The Pirbright Institute (Pirbright), formerly the Institute for Animal Health (IAH)
- Quadram Institute (Norwich), formerly the Institute of Food Research
- The Roslin Institute (RI) (Midlothian), part of the University of Edinburgh
- Rothamsted Research (Harpenden and North Wyke)

Other research institutes have merged with each other or with local universities. Previous BBSRC (or AFRC) sponsored institutes include:

- Institute of Grassland and Environmental Research (IGER – Aberystwyth), merged with the University of Aberystwyth 2008
- Letcombe Laboratory
- Long Ashton Research Station (LARS – Bristol)
- the Plant Breeding Institute (PBI – Cambridge)
- the Weed Research Organisation (WRO – Oxford)
- Silsoe Research Institute (SRI – Bedfordshire) was closed in 2006.
