= Hermann von Wechlinger Schulte =

American anatomist and academic (1876–1932)

- Born: August 9, 1876 – July 13, 1932; Utica, New York, US
- Died: July 13, 1932 (aged 55); Omaha, Nebraska, US
- Burial place: Prospect Hill Cemetery (North Omaha, Nebraska)
- Occupations: Professor and dean

Academic background
- Education: Trinity College, A.B., 1897; Columbia University College of Physicians and Surgeons, MD, 1902

Academic work
- Discipline: Medicine
- Sub-discipline: Anatomy
- Institutions: Creighton University School of Medicine

Hermann von Wechlinger Schulte (August 9, 1876 – July 13, 1932) was an American anatomist, professor, and dean of Creighton University School of Medicine.

== Early life ==
Schulte was born in 1876 in Utica, New York. His parents were Julia Low and Bernard Schulte. His father immigrated to America from Germany and was an Episcopal minister. His mother was the daughter of landscape painter Edward Delavan Nelson.

Schulte attended St. Paul's School in Concord, New Hampshire from 1888 to 1893. He attended Trinity College, graduating as the class valedictorian with an A.B. in 1897. While at Trinity, he was the literary editor of The Trinity Tablet and was member of Delta Psi (aka St. Anthony Hall) and the honor societies Alpha Omega Alpha, Phi Beta Kappa, and Sigma Xi.

He attended the Columbia University College of Physicians and Surgeons, graduating with a doctor of medicine in 1902. He interned at the Presbyterian Hospital in New York City from 1902 to 1904. He also studied at the University of Berlin in the summer of 1904.

== Career ==
Schulte taught anatomy and conducted research under George Sumner Huntington at Columbia from 1904 to 1917. In 1917, he became a professor of anatomy at Creighton University School of Medicine. In 1918, he became chief of the staff at St. Joseph's Hospital in Omaha. He became dean of the Creighton University School of Medicine in 1919.

Schulte published articles on the anatomy of whales and was known as a leader in the field of anatomical research. In 1922, he became a lieutenant colonel in the Medical Reserve Corps and commanded General Hospital Number 55.

He was a charter member of the American Society of Mammalogists and a fellow of the American Association for the Advancement of Science. He was also a member of the American Museum of Natural History and a fellow the New York Zoological Society. He was vice president of the New York Academy of Sciences and president of the Council of Social Agencies, the Council of Social Work, the Nebraska Academy of Science, the Nebraska Conference for Social Work, and the Omaha chapter of the American Interprofessional Institute.

Schulte was a member of the American Medical Association, the Association for the Study of Internal Secretions, the Catholic Hospital Association, the Harvey Society, the National Tuberculosis Association, the Nebraska State Medical Society, the Omaha-Douglas County Medical Society, the Society for the Study of Internal Secretions, and the United States Public Health Association. He also served on the Omaha mayor's Committee on Communicable Diseases.

== Personal life ==
Schulte was a member of the American Academy of Political and Social Science. He was a trustee for the Society for the Relief of The Disabled and served on the board of the Omaha Public Library, the Public School Lunch and Milk Fund, and the Omaha Chamber of Commerce. Schulte was chairman of the Nebraska Review, and was president of the Nebraska Writer's Guild, Omaha Art Institute, and the University Club. He was a member of the Century Club of New York and the Omaha Athletic Club.

In 1932, he died in his home in Omaha, Nebraska of a heart attack at the age of 55. His funeral services were held at Trinity Cathedral in Omaha. On the day of his funeral, Creighton University closed and flew its flags at half-mast. In addition, the entrance to the Creighton University School of Medicine was draped in black. Except for its emergency section, all departments of St. Joseph's Hospital also closed in his honor.

He was buried in Prospect Hill Cemetery in Omaha.

== Selected publications ==
=== Monographs ===
- Early Stages of Vasculogenesis in the Cat (Felis domestica) with especial reference to the mesenchymal origin of the endothelium. Memoirs of the Wistar Institute of Anatomy and Biology, no. 3. 1914.
- Anatomy of a Foetus of Balaenoptera borealis. Extract from Memoirs of the American Museum of Natural History. New series, vol. 1, pt. VI. April, 1916.

=== Journal articles ===
- "The skull of Kogia breviceps Blainv". Bulletin of the American Museum of Natural History, vol. 37, Article 17 (1917) pp. 361–404.
- "A note on the lumbar vertebrae of Scutisorex Thomas". Bulletin of the American Museum of Natural History, vol. 37, Article 29 (1917) pp. 785–792.
- "The external characters, skeletal muscles and peripheral nerves of Kogia breviceps (Blainville)". Bulletin of the American Museum of Natural History, vol. 38, Article 2 (1918) pp. 7–72.
- "Memoranda upon the anatomy of the respiratory tract, foregut, and thoracic viscera of a foetal Kogia breviceps". Bulletin of the American Museum of Natural History, vol. 38, Article 8 (1918) pp. 231–267.
