= Hospitals in Omaha, Nebraska =

Hospitals in Omaha, Nebraska, have been integral to the city's growth since its founding in 1857. The city has a number of hospitals that were founded by religious groups, and has many medical centers resultant from the mergers of various hospitals. Nebraska is also home to a VA facility that was the only hospital in the United States with a nuclear reactor.

== History ==
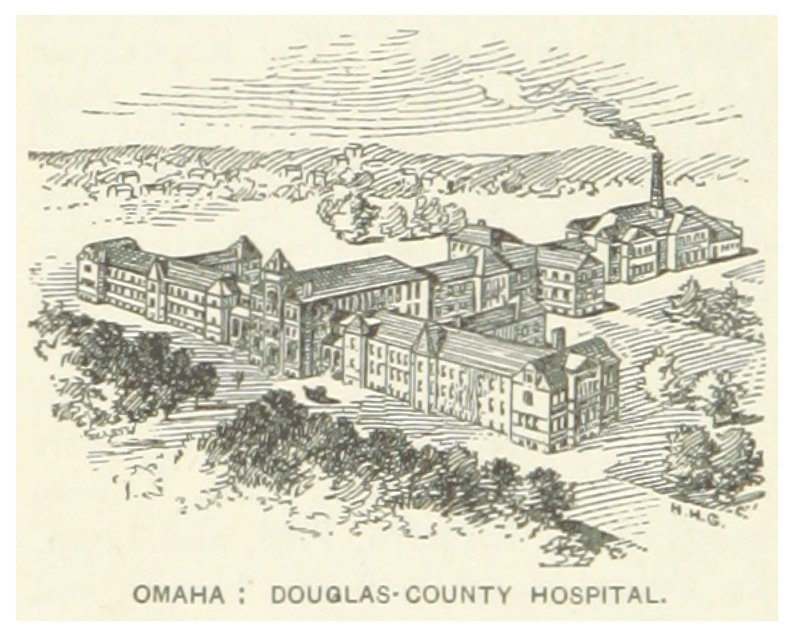
The original 1887 Douglas County Hospital, located on the site of the Douglas County Poor Farm

St. Joseph's Hospital is the oldest healthcare facility in Omaha. The Sisters of Mercy opened the original facility on September 1, 1870. John A. Creighton established the John A. Creighton Medical College and provided funding to the hospital in 1892. It was originally located on lots donated by the Creighton family at 10th and Castelar Streets. A new building was opened at 30th and California Streets that combined both facilities.

The original Immanuel Hospital was located at North 34th and Meredith Avenues in North Omaha. Built alongside the Nazareth Home, the hospital was built in 1890. The four-story brick, gothic structure was severely damaged in a wind storm in early March, 1902. The original Clarkson Memorial Hospital was constructed in 1909 at 2100 Howard Street. Its five stories housed up to 80 patients.

The Douglas County Hospital was planned in 1887. Finished in May 1892, the building was rehabilitated in 1894, due to sub-standard materials and building practices. The original Methodist Episcopal Hospital, located at 20th and Harney Streets, was opened on March 3, 1891. Operated by the Methodist Episcopal Church, the hospital opened at 3612 Cuming Street in 1908, with a capacity to treat 2,000 patients per year. The hospital moved to 84th and West Dodge Road in 1968.

== Historic hospitals ==
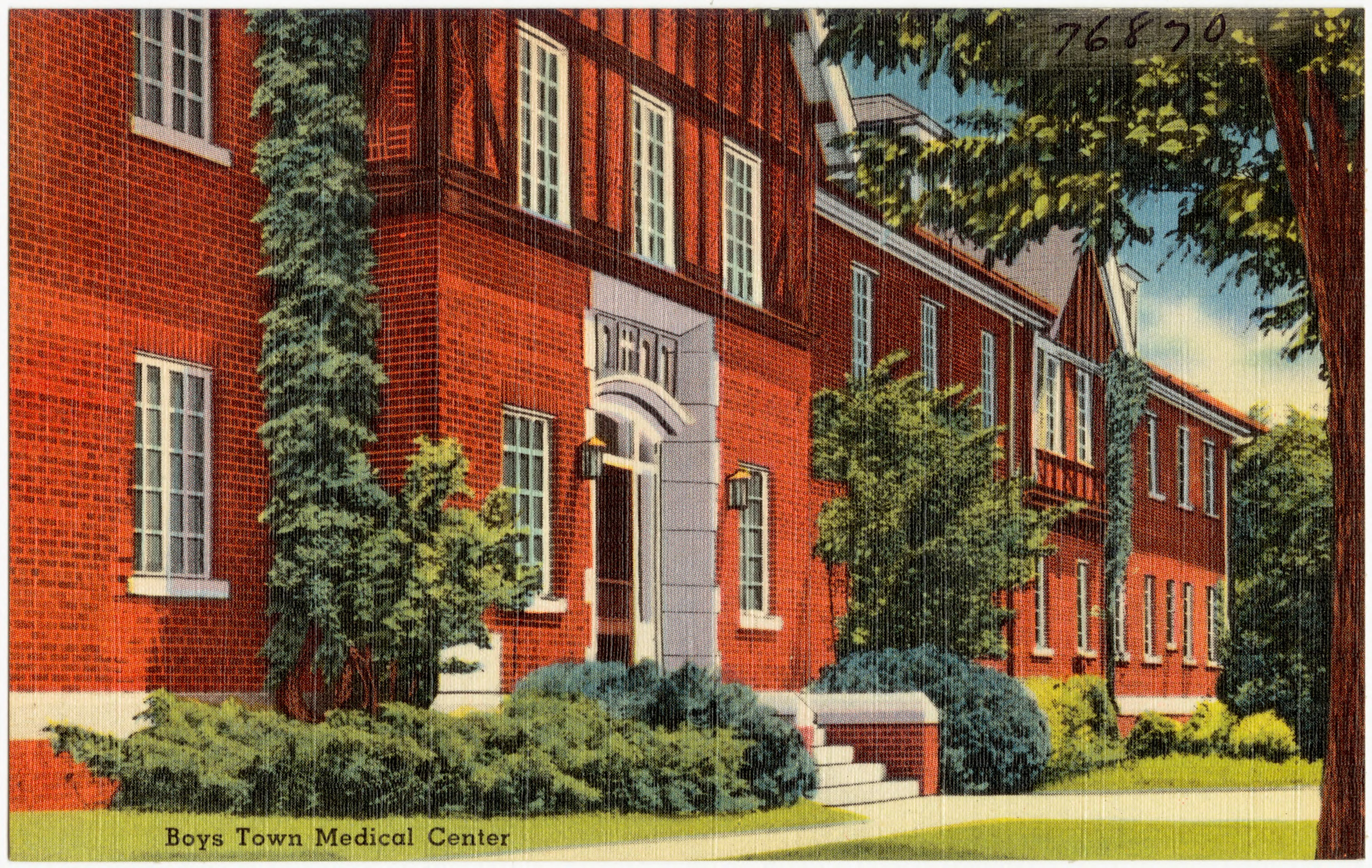
Boys Town Medical Center, Boys Town, Nebraska, c. 1930 – 1945

The Fort Omaha Hospital was opened in 1878 to care for soldiers wounded during the Indian Wars. Built along with several other notable buildings at the Fort, the hospital operated through the 1940s. The Ford Hospital in Omaha was built in 1916. It was a privately operated hospital built and operated by Dr. Michael J. Ford that operated until 1922. Ford was the last small, private hospital in the city. The Nicholas Senn Hospital was located at Park Avenue and Dewey Streets in Midtown Omaha. When it opened on February 1, 1912, the hospital was a modern, 60-bed building that featured one of the "finest x-ray machines in the U.S." Dr. Nicholas Senn, a member of the Rush Medical College in Chicago, Illinois, was the hospital's namesake. The Omaha Christian Institute founded Omaha's General Hospital in 1908. Sold to a private company in 1910, it was renamed Lord Lister Hospital. Located at 14th and Capitol Avenue, the building had 88 beds and treated 1,200 patients annually.

Rabbi Isaac Meyer Wise, founder of American Reform Judaism, was the namesake of Wise Memorial Hospital, which was located at 406 South 24th Street. Sited on a lot donated by the wife of J.L. Brandeis, the facility was built in 1912 for $125,000. Between 1912 and 1917 the hospital treated more than 1,000 patients. In 1930, the institution closed, with the Lutheran Hospital Association purchasing the facility and opening Lutheran Hospital there 1931.

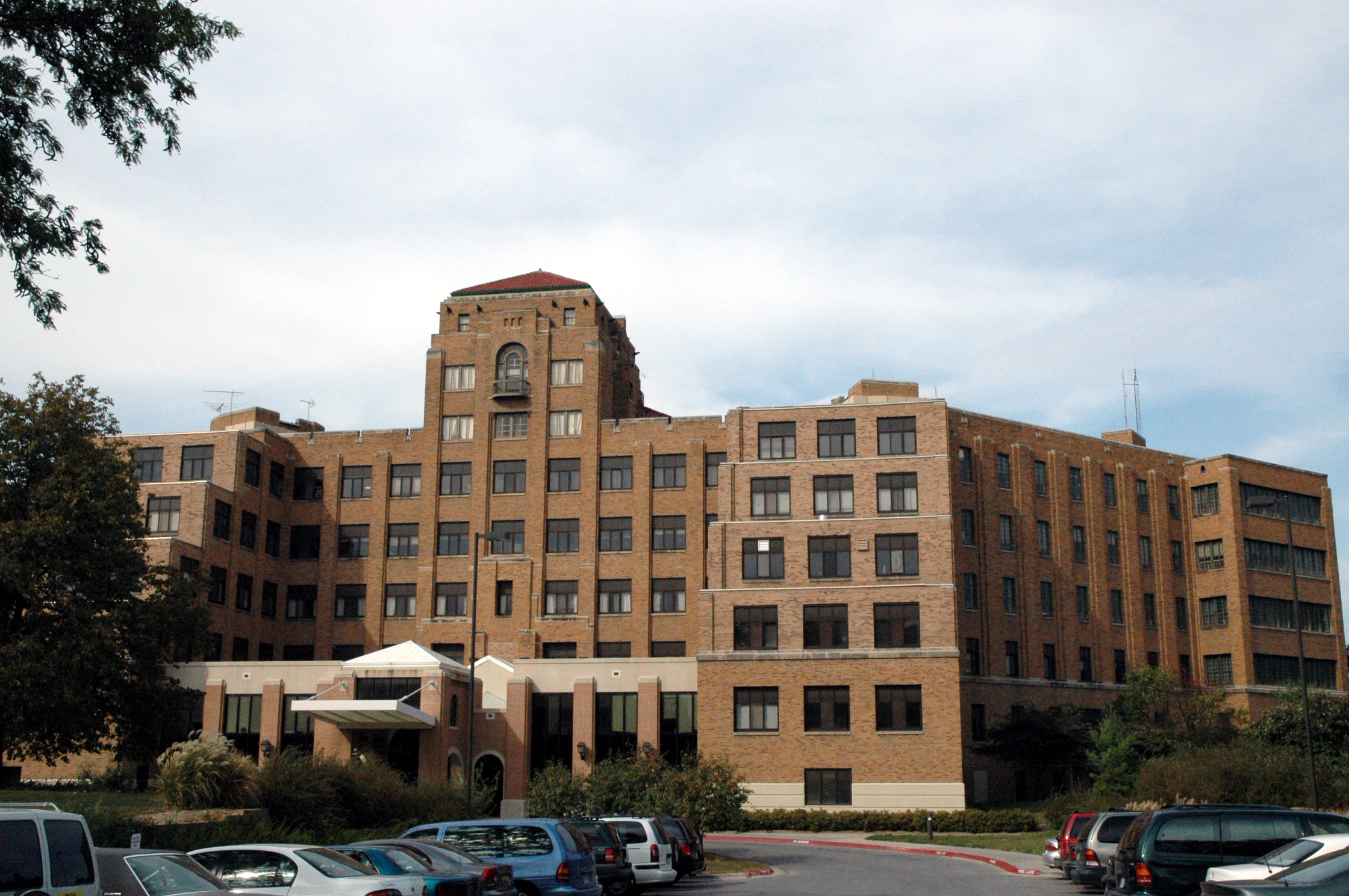
The Douglas County Hospital in Midtown Omaha

St. Catherine's Hospital, located at S. 7th and Forest Ave, was a Catholic institution operated by the Sisters of Mercy from 1910 through 1977. Omaha banker Augustus Kountze sold his "old mansion" on Forest Hill overlooking downtown Omaha to the sisters. With the support of Bishop Scannell in Omaha, they opened a maternity hospital there in 1910. It was never solely a maternity hospital though, and was a busy institution throughout its existence. Originally holding 36 patients, it was expanded in 1916 and 1925, and in 1950 the hospital grew again to 200 beds. In 1962, its mission changed when the Bergan Mercy Hospital opened in west Omaha and it served as a hospital for the aged and dying for the next 15 years. In 1977, the building was sold to Grace Bible College, which operated it until 2018. The original facility still stands within the existing structure, which has been converted into apartments and stands at 811 Forest Avenue.

Evangelical Covenant Hospital was opened as the Swedish Mission Hospital in North Omaha in 1908. Located at 3706 North 24th Street, it was renamed the Evangelical Covenant Hospital in 1924. The hospital was funded by the Swedish Evangelical Covenant Church and closed in 1938 due to financial difficulties. Sold to the Salvation Army, the building was a maternity hospital and senior home for several decades before it was demolished in 1975.

Other historic hospitals in Omaha include "Omaha’s first Mercy Hospital, Wise Memorial, Central, Immanuel Deaconess, Booth Memorial Women, Fort Omaha Hospital, Methodist and Midtown, Kountze Park, St. Luke, Presbyterian, Frederick, St. Joseph, and The People’s Hospital have all called North Omaha home. The Negro Women’s Christian Home, the Friendship House, and the Charles Drew Health Center have all been here, too."

Two private for-profit hospitals, Millard Family Hospital and Papillion Family Hospital, operated until 2024 when their owner Family Health Systems closed both locations. One former employee reported that they were given only ten hours notice that the company "no longer had the funds to support Nebraska operations", and that their patients had to be quickly discharged. The closings resulted in 72 layoffs, after which employee's pay and 401(k) rollovers were delayed after HR data was erased, which also made it impossible for them to receive unemployment. Family Health Systems CEO Dr. Henry Higgins said he felt "horrible" about the closures.

== Hospital segregation ==
Omaha has a long history of racial segregation in hospitals and healthcare. In addition to preventing Black people from using the city's hospitals for a century, Jim Crow also prevented dozens of African American physicians, surgeons and specialists from using these institutions as well. In extreme circumstances, it was regular practice for Black doctors to leave their patients at the doors of a hospital to be attended by white doctors. Not only did this deny African American patients from their regular doctor's services, it also denied Black doctors' income from attending their regular patients at hospitals.

In response to this situation, there were several attempts to start segregated hospitals in the city's primary historic African American neighborhood called the Near North Side. Out of more than a half-dozen initiatives, one facility called the People's Hospital was launched and maintained by Dr. Aaron McMillan for five years before being closed by the City of Omaha. Additionally, Black healthcare professionals kept independent offices to serve their patients in North Omaha, South Omaha and downtown Omaha from the 1870s through the 1970s.

To this day, North Omaha is a healthcare desert with no hospitals and few healthcare clinics available throughout the community. Today, the Charles Drew Health Center, an independent 501(c)(3) organization, is one such provider that primarily serves the Black population in Omaha today.

== List of hospitals ==
Hospitals in Omaha (alphabetical order)
Name	Location	Founded	Affiliation	Notes	Link
Boys Town National Research Hospital	555 N. 30th Street	1977	Independent 501(c)(3) network	Also operates six clinics and a sister hospital, Boys Town National Research Hospital – West, on the Boys Town campus, in Boys Town, Nebraska.	Link
Charles Drew Health Center	2915 Grant Street	Late 1970s	Independent 501(c)(3) organization	Named in honor of Dr. Charles Drew	Link
CHI Health Lakeside	16901 Lakeside Hills Court	August, 2004	CHI Health	Only full-service hospital in West Omaha.	Link
CHI Midlands (Midlands Hospital)	11111 South 84th Street, Papillion	1976	CHI Health	Originally Doctors Hospital at Park Ave and Leavenworth in Omaha, founded in 1907.	Link
Children's Hospital & Medical Center	8200 Dodge Street	1949	Private	145-bed hospital serving patients from Nebraska, western Iowa, South Dakota, northern Kansas and northwestern Missouri with over 30 pediatric specialty clinics.	Link
Creighton University Medical Center - Bergan Mercy	7500 Mercy Road (previously 601 North 30th Street)	September, 1870	CHI Health	Founded by the Sisters of Mercy, as Saint Catherine's Hospital at Ninth and Forest Streets in Downtown Omaha; the Sisters of St. Francis assumed management in 1880. Previous names include Creighton Memorial, Saint Joseph Hospital, Saint Joseph Hospital at Creighton University Medical Center. Creighton University Medical Center permanently moved hospital services to Bergan Mercy Medical Center in 2017.	
Douglas County Health Center	4102 Woolworth Avenue	1886	Douglas County	Founded as the Douglas County Hospital as a pest house	Link
Immanuel Medical Center	6901 North 72nd Street	1910	CHI Health	Originally located at North 34th and Meredith Streets	Link
Methodist Hospital	8303 Dodge Street	May 1891	Nebraska Methodist Health System	Founded by the Methodist Episcopal Church near 20th and Harney Streets, moved in 1968	Link
Methodist Women's Hospital	707 N 190th Plaza	2010	Nebraska Methodist Health System	The region's only medical campus devoted to women. Methodist Women's Hospital includes the area's largest neonatal intensive care unit as well as an emergency department and imaging and laboratory services for men, women and children.	Link
Nebraska Medical Center	42nd and Dewey Streets	1916	Nebraska Medicine	Created by the merger of Bishop Clarkson Hospital and University Hospital, in 1997, The Nebraska Medical Center is the primary teaching hospital for the University of Nebraska Medical Center. While affiliated with UNMC, The Nebraska Medical Center is not operated by the state of Nebraska or the university system. It is a private non-profit hospital governed by a board of directors. Bishop Clarkson first opened Childs Hospital in Omaha, in 1869. Clarkson Hospital first opened at 21st and Harney. A new Clarkson Hospital was built adjacent to University Hospital, at 42nd and Dewey, in 1955.	Link
Nebraska Orthopaedic Hospital	2808 South 143rd Plaza	2004	Private, for-profit	Nebraska's first and only orthopaedic specialty hospital. A partnership between Nebraska Medicine and local orthopaedic surgeons.	Link
Omaha - VA Nebraska-Western Iowa Health Care System	4101 Woolworth Avenue		Veterans Administration	Once the world's only hospital with a nuclear reactor.	Link

== See also ==
- List of hospitals in Nebraska
- Nebraska Methodist Health System
- CHI Health
- Historic companies in Omaha, Nebraska
- Nebraska Medicine
- University of Nebraska Medical Center
