= Creighton University School of Medicine =

Medical school in Omaha, Nebraska, US

Coordinates: 41°15′59″N 95°57′03″W

- Type: Private
- Established: 1892
- Affiliations: Roman Catholic (Jesuit)
- Dean: Robert W. Dunlay
- Faculty: 278 full-time
- Students: 609
- Location: Omaha, Nebraska, United States
- Campus: Urban
- Tuition (2015-2016): $54,512
- Colours: Blue and white
- Website: www.creighton.edu/medicine

The Creighton University School of Medicine is the graduate medical school at Creighton University in Omaha, Nebraska, United States, and grants the Doctor of Medicine (MD) degree. It was founded in 1892. A satellite campus opened in 2012 at St. Joseph's Hospital and Medical Center in Phoenix, Arizona, becoming the first Jesuit medical program west of Omaha. Initially, all matriculating students completed preclinical coursework in Omaha, and 42 third-year students completed their clinical rotations in Phoenix, with elective options at both campuses during their fourth year. As of 2021, students now complete pre-clinical coursework at both the Omaha and Phoenix campuses.

Since 2017, the primary teaching hospital is Bergan Mercy Medical Center. Both are affiliates of CHI Health, a division of Catholic Health Initiatives.

For the class of 2018, Creighton received 6771 applications and interviewed 649 students for the matriculated class of 155. The average GPA for admitted students was 3.77, with an average MCAT of 513. The class consisted of 75 (48.4%) males and 80 (51.6%) females.

== Deans of the School of Medicine ==
There have been 17 deans of Creighton University School of Medicine since its founding.

- Patrick S. Keogh, MD (1892–1896)
- DeWitt Clinton Bryant, MD, FACS (1896^; 1897–1900; 1901–1913)
- John Prentiss Lord, MD, FACS (1900–1901)
- Archibald Lawrence Muirhead, MD (1913–1915)
- Robert Retzer, MD (1915–1916)
- James Ross Clemens, BM, B.Ch., FRCS (1916–1918)
- Herman von W. Schulte (1918–1932)
- Rev. John Joseph McInerny, S.J. (1932–1933)^
- Bryan Michael Riley, MD, FACP (1933–1939)
- Charles Martel Wilhelmj, MD (1939–1948)
- Percy J. Carroll, MD, FACP (1948–1951)
- Richard Leo Egan, MD, FACP (1959–1970)
- Joseph Michael Holthaus, MD, FACP (1970–1980)
- James Erwin Hoff, SJ, Ph.D. (1980–1982)^
- Richard L. O'Brien, MD, FACP (1982–1992)
- Robert Dunlay, MBA, MD (1/2013-12/2013^, 12/2013-)

^ denotes term of acting dean

== Academics ==
=== Preclinical years ===
The first two years of school, known as the preclinical years, focus on learning the science of medicine. The first year consists of classes in Anatomy, Molecular and Cell Biology, Ethical and Legal Topics in Clinical Medicine, Interviewing and Physical Exam, Host Defense, Principles of Microbiology, Evidence Based Medicine, Principles of Pharmacology, Behavioral Medicine I, CU Humanities Program, Neuroscience, and Physicians Lifestyle Management. Healer's Art is an elective course that can be taken at the beginning of the spring semester. Following spring break, the M1 year ends with the first organ systems course, Neuroscience.

The second year of medical school consists of organ systems based classes that last from 2–5 weeks each. These courses include Infectious Diseases, Hematology/Oncology, Cardiovascular, Respiratory, Renal, Endocrine/ Reproduction, Musculoskeletal/ Integument, Gastrointestinal, and Behavioral Medicine II. There are also two concurrent classes that run throughout the year which include Case Studies in Medicine and Applied Clinical Skills. The year ends with review and time to study for the USMLE Step 1 which is taken between the end of May and the middle of June.

=== Clinical years ===
The third and fourth years of medical school consist of clinical rotations throughout hospitals and clinics. There are seven third year clinical rotations that last 6-8 weeks each: Family Medicine (6 weeks), Emergency Medicine (2 weeks), Internal Medicine (8 weeks), Psychiatry (6 weeks), Surgery (6 weeks), Pediatrics (6 weeks), Neurology (8 weeks - four of which are electives), and Obstetrics and Gynecology (6 weeks). Fourth year consists of 1 4-week surgical selective, 1 4-week critical care selective, 1 4-week primary care selective or 2nd critical care selective, and an additional 24 weeks of clinical electives with no more than 8 weeks of non-clinical electives. A senior Objective structured clinical examination (OSCE) is required prior to completion of USMLE Step 2 CS and graduation.

Third year medical students are able to do family medicine rotations in rural Iowa, Nebraska, Wyoming, and Arizona. Creighton also sends a group of third year students to San Francisco for internal medicine rotations.

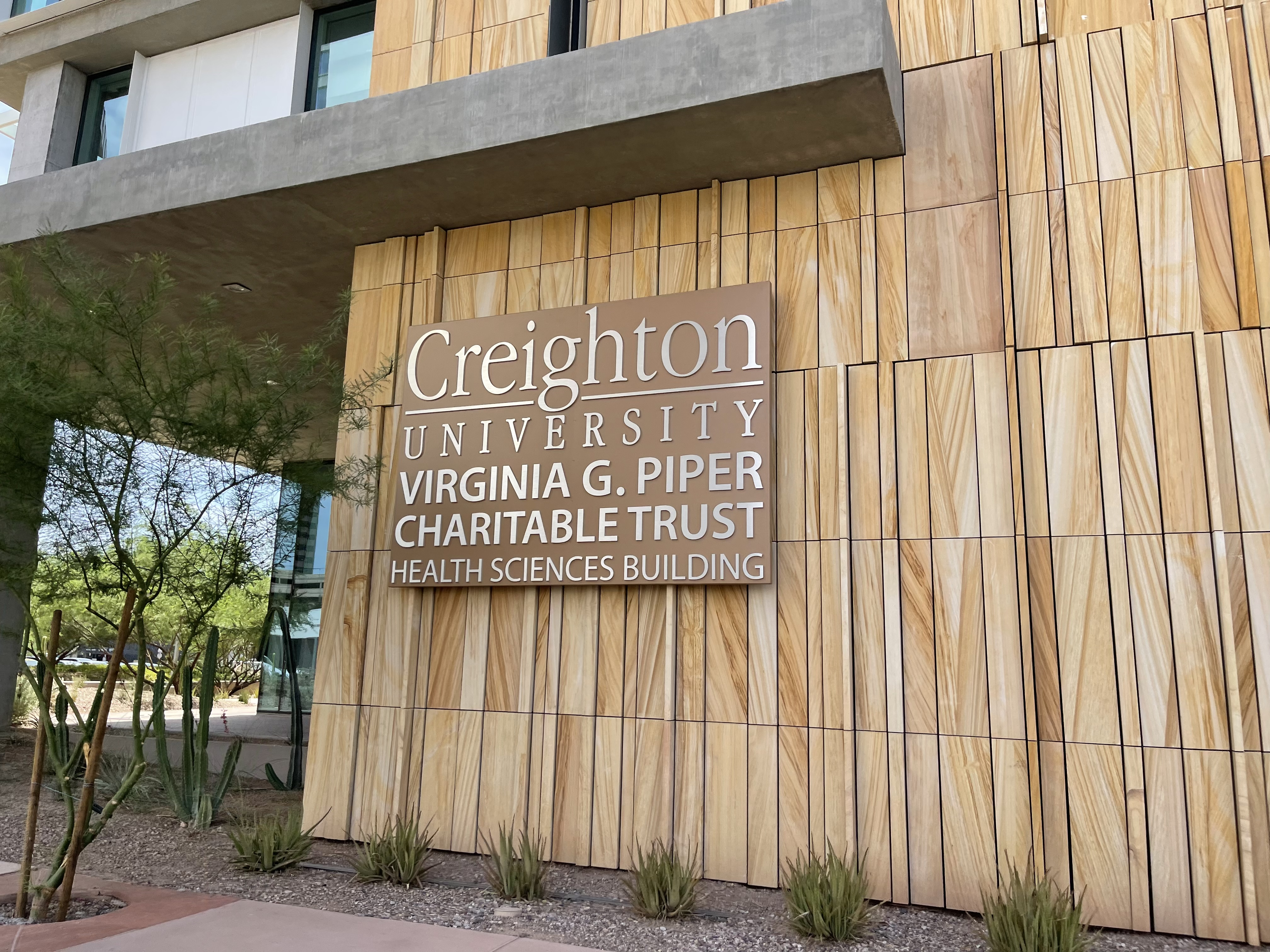
Creighton University School of Medicine, Phoenix Campus

=== Phoenix campus ===
Creighton University School of Medicine in Omaha and St. Joseph's Hospital and Medical Center have created an academic affiliation that will create a Creighton medical school presence in Phoenix. The Creighton campus in Phoenix will be the only Catholic medical school campus located west of Omaha.

The affiliation will expand educational opportunities available to Creighton medical students while allowing the University's School of Medicine to recruit more students. The collaboration is also designed to strengthen the medical reputations of both institutions, promote the sharing of faculty and administrative expertise, create collaborative research opportunities, and enhance medical services for Arizona patients.

Since 2005, Creighton and St. Joseph's have had an agreement that sends Creighton medical students to Phoenix for one-month rotations. Under the new affiliation, Creighton will establish a fully operational campus at St. Joseph's that will offer two full years of clinical training. Creighton expanded its entering medical class from 126 to 152 students in 2010. All students will train for their first two years in Omaha. Starting in 2012, 42 third-year students will move to Phoenix for their final two years of training, and 110 third-year students will remain in Omaha. The Phoenix campus will graduate its first students in 2014.

== Student clubs and organizations ==
=== Service ===
Creighton emphasizes community service, and even though it is not required, 100% of students participate in some form of service during their time in medical school. Creighton students operate and staff the Magis Clinic, which provides free health care to the homeless and poor in Omaha.

Between first and second year, many medical students participate in Project CURA. CURA is a student-run program which sends medical missions to countries including Peru, Ghana, India, and Nicaragua. CUSOM is also home to the Institute for Latin American Concern (ILAC), which sends fourth-year medical students, as well as pharmacy and nursing students, to the Dominican Republic.

Creighton Phi Chi is a co-ed medical fraternity located near campus. Fraternity members take turns preparing nightly meals and share a large house near campus. All residents have their own rooms, with private or shared bathrooms. Phi Chi is known for its annual Halloween party.

== Notable alumni and faculty ==
- Henry T. Lynch, cancer researcher, namesake of hereditary nonpolyposis colorectal cancer or Lynch syndrome
- Dr. Richard J. Bellucci, hearing researcher and surgeon, pioneer in stapedectomy, Director of Otolaryngology at New York Medical College and the Manhattan Ear Nose and Throat Hospital, and inventor of the Bellucci Micro Ear Scissors.

== See also ==
- Creighton University
- Saint Joseph Hospital at Creighton University Medical Center
