= Sheritta A. Strong =

American adult psychiatrist

- Born: Omaha, Nebraska, U.S.
- Education: University of Nebraska at Omaha; University of Nebraska Medical Center
- Known for: Mental health advocacy, #ShareTheMicNowMed campaign
- Awards: Distinguished Fellow of the American Psychiatric Association, American Psychiatric Association's Nancy C.A. Roeske, M.D. National Education Award
- Scientific career
- Fields: Psychiatry
- Workplaces: University of Nebraska Medical Center

Sheritta A. Strong is an American adult psychiatrist and an associate professor in the Department of Psychiatry at the University of Nebraska Medical Center (UNMC). Strong is a leader in education and advocacy at UNMC, is the co-director of Medical Student Education in the Department of Psychiatry as well as the Assistant Vice Chancellor of Inclusion at UNMC. As a psychiatrist, Strong focuses her clinical attention on treating patients with chronic and persistent mental illness. She is also dedicated to reducing barriers to healthcare access for marginalized populations and she mentors underrepresented scientists and physicians to increase their retention in healthcare. In 2018, Strong was awarded the Nancy C.A. Roeske, M.D., Certificate of Recognition for Excellence in Medical Student Education by the American Psychiatric Association (APA) and in 2020 Strong became a Distinguished Fellow of the APA.

== Early life and education ==
Strong was born in Omaha, Nebraska. She pursued her undergraduate degree at the University of Nebraska at Omaha in 1995, graduating in 1999 with a Bachelors of Science. Pursuing a career in medicine, Strong began her medical degree training at the University of Nebraska Medical Center. She completed her MD in 2004. Following her M.D., Strong stayed in Nebraska and pursued her residency training in Psychiatry at the Creighton Nebraska Psychiatry Training Program through the UNMC College of Medicine. She completed her Residency training in 2008.

== Career and research ==
After completing her residency, Strong became a Clinical instructor of Psychiatry in 2009 at Creighton University Medical Center, affiliated with the University of Nebraska Medical Center (UNMC). In 2012, she was appointed to Assistant Professor of Psychiatry. In 2011, Strong became a Director of Second Year Psychiatry Medical Student Education at UNMC. In 2020, Strong was appointed Interim Director of Inclusion at UNMC.

Since 2008, Strong has practiced Adult Psychiatry at the Charles Drew Health Center in Omaha, Nebraska. She also has hospital appointments at the Nebraska Medical Center, the Omaha VA Medical Center, and the Creighton University Medical Center.

Within UNMC, Strong is an educator, a leader of outreach of advocacy, and a mentor. As an associate professor and co-director of education, Strong teaches medical students interview skills and she also runs the pre-clinical psychiatry course. Strong is also a supervisor of psychotherapy residents and Directs Psychiatry Night at UNMC. Strong is also a faculty mentor and supervisor for a campus wide mentorship initiative called G.R.A.D.S. and she is a founding member of I-AM-HOME, which is a network of professionals dedicated to recruiting underrepresented health care professionals and increasing their retention in healthcare. Strong is also the Faculty Board Chairman of the SHARING Clinic which provides low-cost health care to the community through four different clinics in the Omaha area.

Outside of UNMC, Strong is a member of the National Medical Association, Alpha Kappa Alpha sorority, and is a Distinguished Fellow of the American Psychiatric Association. As a member of Alpha Kappa Alpha, Strong is the Corresponding Secretary of the Graduate chapter as well as a Graduate Advisor. She was also the president of the Omaha Chapter from 2010 to 2011. Strong is also a member of Communications Committee for the Alliance for Clinical Education (ACE), the organization that hosts #MedEdChat on Twitter and aims to enhance clinical instruction for medical students. During the COVID-19 pandemic, Strong has been a leader and educator for the public by serving on the Central Area of the Omaha Chapter Links, Incorporated to discuss ways to cope during the virus. After the police murder of George Floyd, Strong has been using Twitter as a platform to amplify the voices of Black women in STEM and medicine through the #ShareTheMicNowMed campaign.

== Awards and honors ==
- 2020 Distinguished Fellow of the American Psychiatric Association
- 2019 Early Career Achievement Award UNMC
- 2018 American Psychiatric Association's Nancy C.A. Roeske, M.D. National Education Award
- 2017 Keynote speaker for the Urban League's Scholarship Reception
- 2014 National Coalition of Negro Women's (NCNW) Women in Medicine Award
- 2010 President of Alpha Kappa Alpha Sorority, Inc.

== Select media ==
- 2020 Omaha World Herald “Midlands Voices: Let's all work to reduce our stress level”
- 2020 Featured in Medscape “Hashtag Medicine: #ShareTheMicNowMed Highlights Black Female Physicians on Social Media”
- 2018 Featured on NewsNow Omaha KMTV “College of Saint Mary's African American mentoring program continues to grow”

== Select publications ==
- Erdahl LM, Chandrabose RK, Pitt SC, Radford DM, Strong SA, Silver JK. A Call for Professionalism: Addressing Gender Bias in Surgical Training. J Surg Educ. 2020;77(4):718-719. doi:10.1016/j.jsurg.2020.02.004
