= Children's Hospital & Medical Center =

Children's hospital in Omaha, Nebraska, U.S.

Coordinates: 41°15′37″N 96°02′30″W

Children's Nebraska
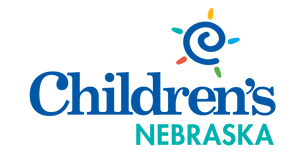

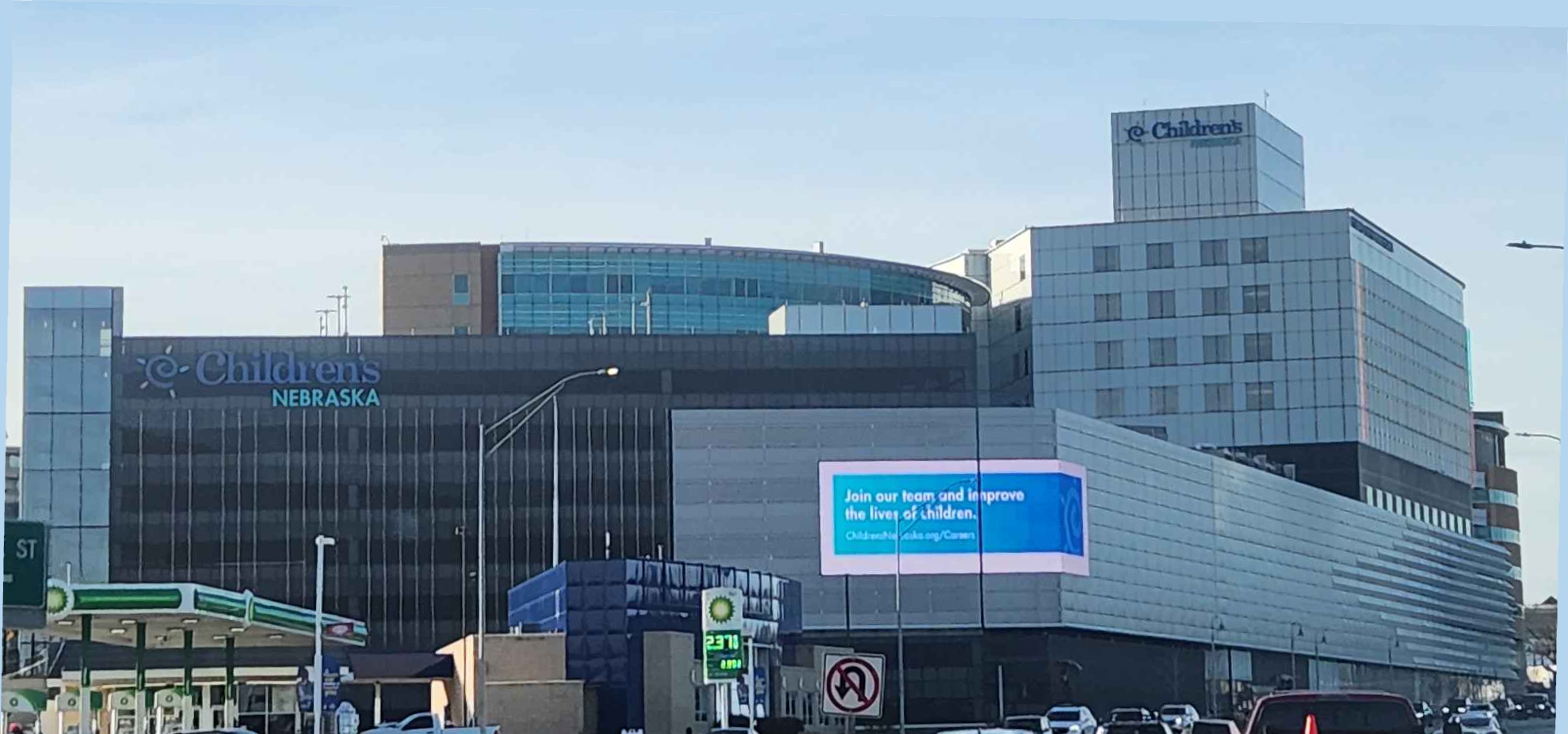
- Children's Nebraska's flagship hospital

Geography
- Location: 8200 Dodge St., Omaha, Nebraska, U.S.

Organisation
- Care system: Private
- Type: Pediatric

Services
- Emergency department: Level I Pediatric Trauma Center
- Beds: 279

Helipads
- Helipad: Yes

History
- Founded: 1948

Links
- Website: www.childrensnebraska.org

Children's Nebraska is an American non-profit regional pediatric specialty health care system and hospital based in Omaha, Nebraska, United States. The 279-bed hospital is the only free-standing children's hospital in Nebraska. Children's Nebraska was formed in 1948 by Henry Doorly and Dr. C.W.M. Poytner as Children's Memorial Hospital. In 1981, the hospital moved to the North Tower of Methodist Hospital and re-branded to Children's Hospital & Medical Center. Children's later moved to its own building in 2000. In 2023, the hospital changed its name to Children's Nebraska.

The hospital provides more than 50 pediatric specialty clinics for a variety of specialized needs including asthma, cardiology, neurology, pediatric cancer, neonatal intensive care follow-up, diabetes, and physical, occupational, and speech therapies. The hospital also operates Children's Physicians, a pediatric primary healthcare system. The hospital also offers the Carolyn Scott Rainbow House, a home-away-from-home for families of patients.

== History ==
Children's Nebraska opened as Children's Memorial Hospital on March 14, 1948. The institution was founded by Dr. C.W.M. Poynter, dean of the University of Nebraska Medical Center, and Henry Doorly, publisher of the Omaha World-Herald. The first building was located on what is now the University of Nebraska Medical Center's main campus. In June 1962, an addition was made to the West of the building.

In 1976, Children's Memorial Hospital announced plans with the Nebraska Methodist Health System to move into the first few floors hospital's proposed North Tower at their flagship hospital. The addition was having issues with state approval, with the Nebraska Health Department deciding that it was unnecessary. Children's and Methodist then filed a lawsuit attempting to receive approval. On August 19, 1978, U.S. District Judge Warren Keith Urbom ruled in favor of construction. The North Tower officially opened in 1981.

In January 1993, plans were announced to move the hospital out of leased space in Methodist's North hospital tower and into its own dedicated facility. However, these plans were later put on hold. In 1996, Children's Hospital formed Children's Physicians with Creighton University. In August 1997, plans were again announced, with an estimated cost of $83 million. The building opened in 2000.

The Children's Specialty Pediatric Center opened on September 1, 2010. In December 2016, ground was broken for the Hubbard Center for Children. The addition would increase the overall bed count from 140 to 250. Construction began in January 2018. The building was completed in August 2021. In October 2023, Children's Hospital & Medical Center changed its name to Children's Nebraska. In February 2025, a $114 million addition, known as the Behavioral Health & Wellness Center was announced. It officially opened on January 7, 2026.

== Services ==
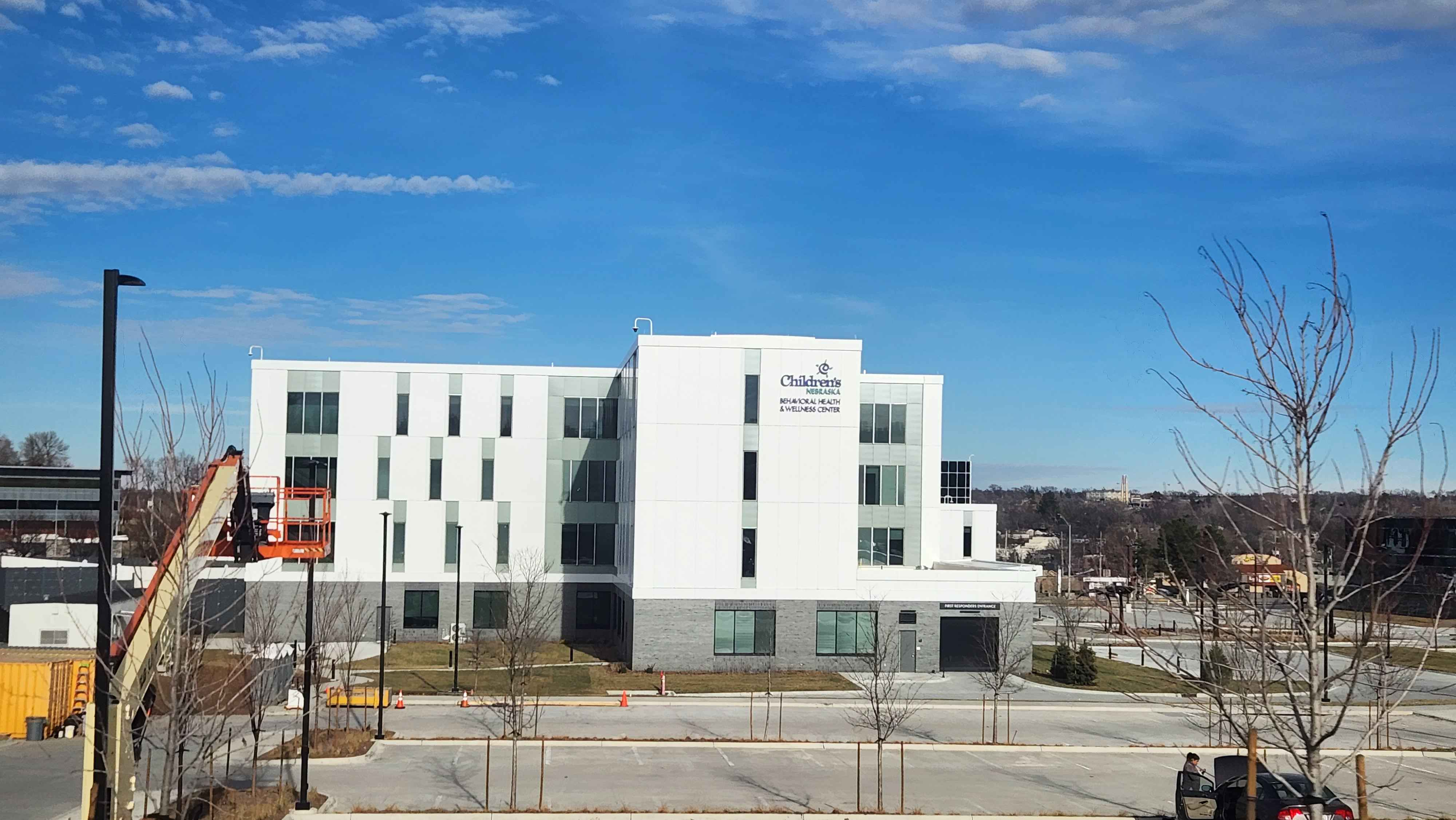
Children's Nebraska Behavior Health & Wellness Center in 2025

Children's Nebraska is a not-for-profit pediatric organization. It is a member of the Children's Miracle Network Hospitals. The main hospital is located in Central Omaha, Nebraska. The main hospital is a Level I pediatric trauma center and is the only free-standing children's hospital in the State of Nebraska. The organization also operates the Behavior Health and Wellness Center at Children's Nebraska, a psychiatric hospital that opened in 2026. Additionally, Children's Nebraska operates Children's Physicians, a pediatric healthcare system. It primarily serves the Omaha–Council Bluffs metropolitan area, along with Lincoln, and Kearney.

== Awards ==
Children's Nebraska has been recognized as one of the leading pediatric hospitals and has been awarded the 2019 Women's Choice Award for Best Children's Hospitals.

== See also ==
- Hospitals in Omaha, Nebraska
