= Methodist Jennie Edmundson Hospital =

Hospital in Council Bluffs, Iowa, U.S.

- Nebraska Methodist Health System

Geography
- Location: 933 E Pierce St., Council Bluffs, Iowa, U.S.
- Coordinates: 41.26844492009786°N 95.83481309694929°W

Organisation
- Type: General hospital

History
- Opened: 1886

Links
- Website: bestcare.org/locations/methodist-jennie-edmundson-hospital

Methodist Jennie Edmundson Hospital is a general hospital is located at 933 E. Pierce Street, Council Bluffs, Iowa, United States. It is one of four major facilities comprising the Nebraska Methodist Health System. The hospital was established in 1886 and changed to its current name in 1905. The hospital moved to its current location in 1963.

== History ==
The hospital was established in 1886. The hospital was added to the Jennie Edmundson Hospital School of Nursing, accredited through the National League for Nursing, and approved by the Iowa Board of Nursing.

In early 1905, the hospital was announced by the Women's Christian Association. It was designed by Fischer & Lawrie. In July 1905, J.D. Edmundson donated $40,000 to development under the condition that the hospital be named after his late wife Jennie Edmundson. Construction officially began in 1906 with the hospital officially opening in February 1907.

In 1957, the hospital announced plans to move to its now current location. The facility was designed by Leo A. Daly and would include a 220 bed hospital and a 100 bed nursing home. The hospital began construction in 1959 and officially opened on August 7, 1963.

The hospital became a Methodist Health System affiliate in 1994, forming the Jennie Edmundson Foundation that same year. The Jennie Edmundson Hospital School of Nursing closed in June 1997.

In May 2001, the hospital broke ground on an $18 million addition to the Northwest side of the building and remodeling to the second and third floors. The addition and subsequent renovations were completed in 2004. In November 2013, the hospital began major renovations, including adding new floors, ceilings, lights, and doors. Renovation projects were completed in 2014.

== Operations ==
The 236-bed regional health care center serves southwestern Iowa, and employs a workforce of 464 full-time and nearly 250 part-time employees, and has an active medical staff of 132 physicians. Methodist Jennie Edmundson Hospital offers a 24-hour Level III Emergency Department that treated approximately 22,000 patient visits last year. The hospital had a total of 5,101 admissions. Its physicians performed 1,718 inpatient and 6,361 outpatient surgeries. Methodist Jennie Edmundson Hospital is a member of VHA and recently completed an $18 million renovation and construction project that netted the hospital nearly 31,000 square feet of new space for the intensive care unit and surgical suite.

== See also ==
- Hospitals in Omaha
- Nebraska Methodist Health System
- Methodist Women's Hospital
- Methodist Hospital (Omaha, Nebraska)
