= Hotel Pathfinder explosion =

1976 explosion in Fremont, Nebraska, U.S.

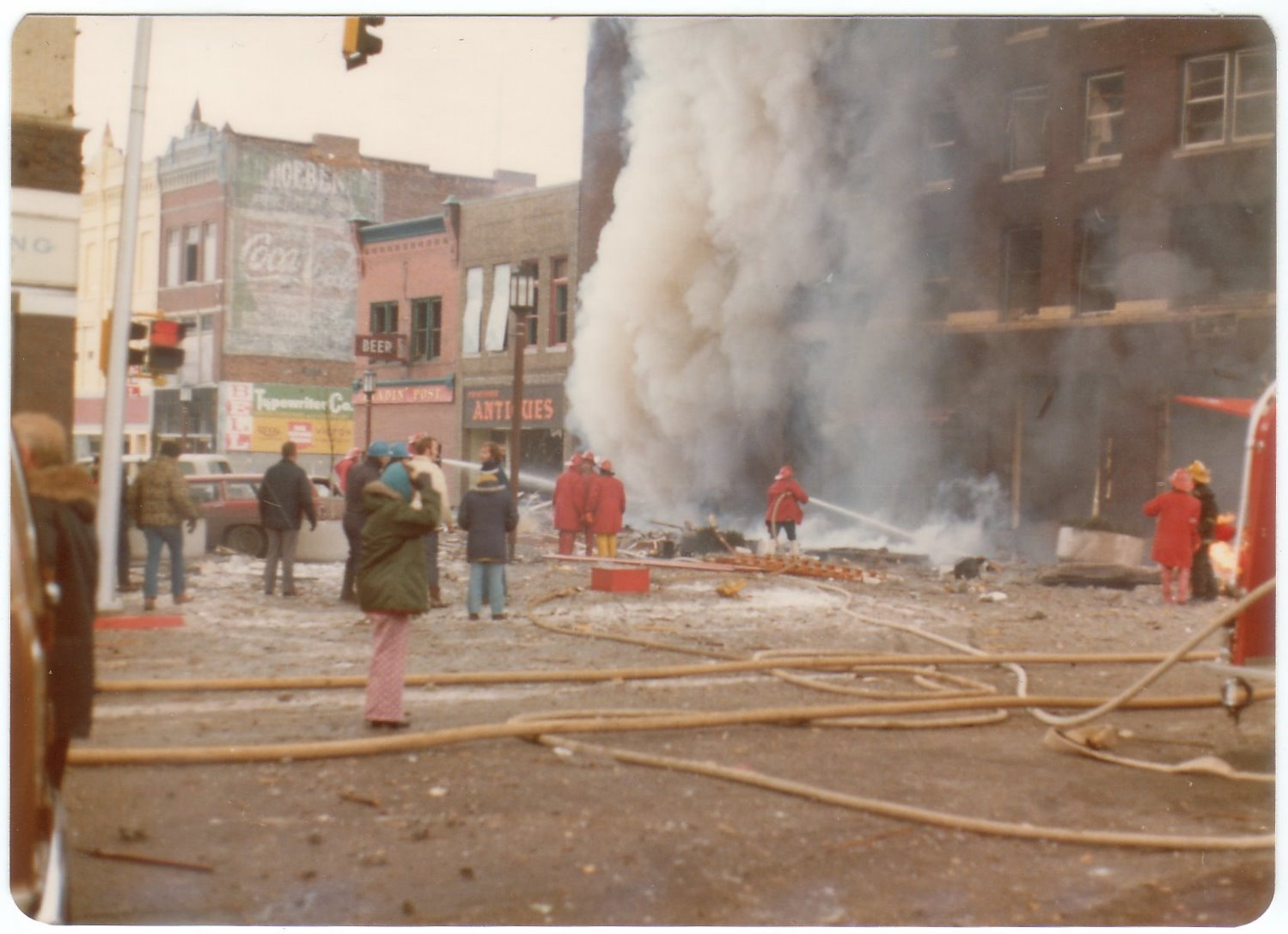
- View of fire crew and debris looking south-east from Broad and 6th St.
- Date: January 10, 1976; 50 years ago
- Time: 9:32 a.m. (CST)
- Location: Fremont, Nebraska, U.S.; 41.434450417758995°N 96.49820245707252°W
- Also known as: Pathfinder Hotel explosion
- Type: Hotel fire and explosion
- Cause: Natural gas leak
- Deaths: 20
- Injuries: Over 40

On January 10, 1976, the Hotel Pathfinder in Fremont, Nebraska, United States, exploded due to a gas leak. The six-story hotel building internally collapsed, resulting in 20 deaths and 40 injuries, and caused a fire. The explosion also severely damaged seven surrounding buildings, including the Love-Larson Opera House. Additionally, over 80 lawsuits were filed in connection with the events. The remains of the Hotel Pathfinder were subsequently demolished in February 1977. It was the deadliest explosion in the United States at the time, and remains the deadliest fire in the state of Nebraska.

== Background ==
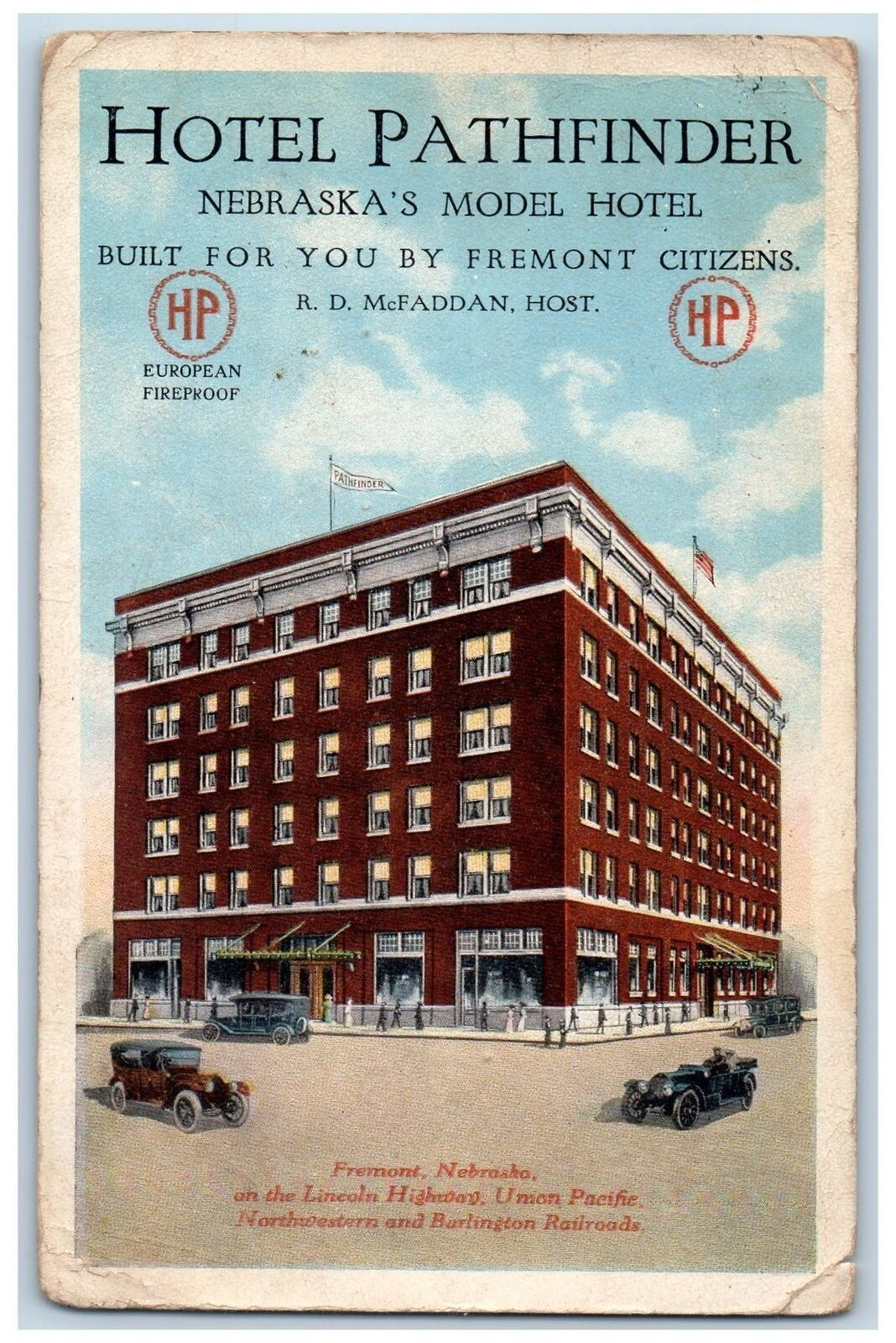
Hotel Pathfinder as seen in 1918

=== Hotel Pathfinder ===
Hotel Pathfinder was a six-story hotel constructed in 1917 and located on the southeast corner of 6th & Broad streets. The hotel replaced the former Eno Hotel Building, a three-story tall hotel that had been razed to build Pathfinder. The hotel was named after John C. Frémont, whose nickname was "Pathfinder". The hotel included 115 rooms and had a restaurant, a ballroom, and a barbershop. The hotel was visited by several notable individuals, including then-Massachusetts Senator John F. Kennedy in 1959, while he was campaigning to be the Democratic nominee for president.

On February 23, 1954, natural gas had seeped through the west wall of a vaulted sidewalk and ignited. The explosion resulted in a broken part of the concrete sidewalk at the west entrance, caused broken windows, and destroyed basement partitions. The hotel's final owners, Boyd and Louise Hammond, purchased the hotel in March 1972. A day before the explosion, on January 9, 1976, two gas company employees conducted a gas leak survey in downtown Fremont. They discovered no leaks during the survey.

=== Pre-explosion ===
On January 10, 1976, at 4:50 a.m., a man smelled gas while entering the west vestibule of Hotel Pathfinder. He notified the night desk clerk, who checked the second and third floors, but detected no smell of gas. The day desk clerk arrived at 6:35 a.m. and checked the gas appliances in the kitchen but did not find any gas.

At 8:02 a.m., a bakery employee from across the street of the hotel made a phone call to the gas company to report the strong gas odor that he believed came from the alley behind the bakery. She made a phone call to two out of the three available servicemen, with the second informing his supervisor, who went to the hotel. A maintenance man arrived at 8:25 a.m., entered the basement, and checked the gas boilers. They found that no gas was leaking from the boilers or from the three gas meters. The man then went under the vaulted sidewalk on the northwest corner of the hotel and detected gas. He then ran out of the basement and told the clerk to call the third number. They received no response.

By 9:10 a.m., three gas company supervisors and a serviceman arrived at the hotel and used a combustible gas indicator. When the indicator was inserted into the North foundation wall, it indicated there was a gas contamination. They then told the maintenance man to evacuate the building immediately. However, when the explosion occurred at 9:32 a.m., no occupants had evacuated due to poor communication.

== Explosion ==
At 9:32 a.m., natural gas, which was leaking into the building through a two-inch plastic pipe, ignited. The hotel exploded and fire started quickly, both destroying the hotel and surrounding properties. Due to the cold weather, some rescue workers slipped on the ice near the hotel. The explosion destroyed a concrete sidewalk across the street from the hotel and gutted the northwest corner of the hotel. People who were in that corner of the hotel immediately fell down into the basement and were covered by rubble from the explosion.

Survivors were immediately transferred to the Memorial Hospital of Dodge County. On January 11, the death count was estimated to have been 10, with 11 estimated to have been missing. By January 12, 13 bodies had been pulled from the wreckage, while six remaining were presumed dead. That same day, the estimated death count was estimated to be at 20. Eighteen people were killed outright, and two others died in the hospital following the explosion. In total, the explosion killed 20 people and injured over 40.

== Aftermath ==
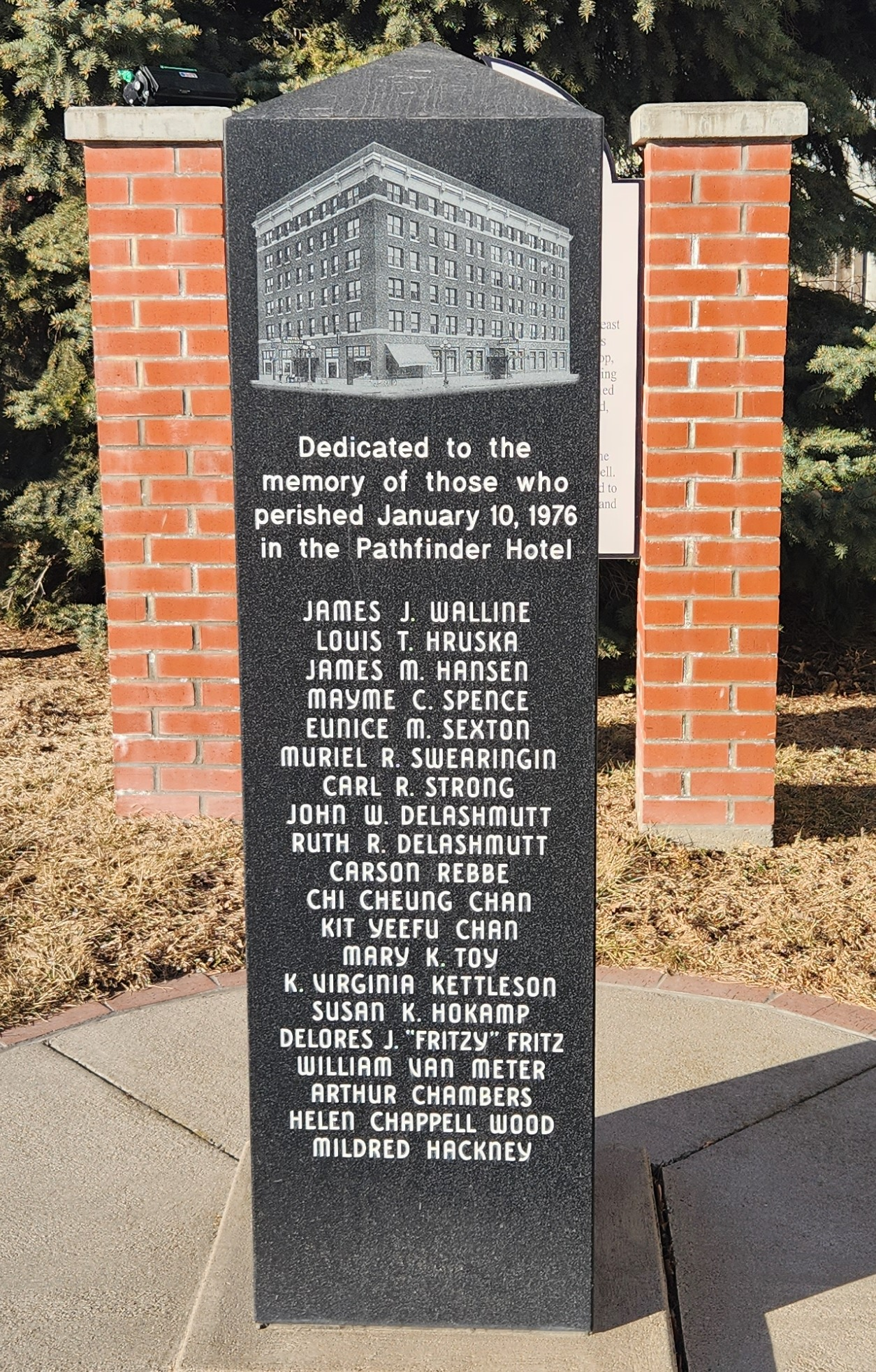
Hotel Pathfinder memorial in 2025

Seven nearby buildings were damaged as a result of the explosion, with five being demolished. One of these buildings, the Love-Larson Opera House, survived the impact mainly due to its 7-inch-thick (18 cm) walls. Demolition of the Hotel Pathfinder was announced to take place in spring 1977, due to the cold weather at the time of the explosion. Demolition of the hotel was completed in February 1977. Following demolition, the site remained vacant until 1983, when a bank and shopping center was built on the site.

In August 1999, the National Fire Protection Association listed the Hotel Pathfinder explosion as the deadliest fire in Nebraska during the 20th century. A permanent monument was erected across the block from the site by Friends of the Pathfinder Hotel on January 10, 2016, the 40th anniversary of the explosion. The incident was the last fatal explosion in Fremont, Nebraska until the Horizon Bio-fuels explosion on July 29, 2025, which killed three people.

=== Legal proceedings ===
In the aftermath of the explosion, over 80 lawsuits were filed in connection to the events. Most notably, in March 1976, a lawsuit was filed by then-owner of the hotel, Louise T. Hammond against Nebraska Natural Gas Co. and DuPont at the Dodge County District Court. Hammond's lawsuit alleged that Nebraska Natural Gas Co. failed to install the pipe in the safe and proper manner, and that DuPont failed to advise the employees on how to properly anchor the pipe. The lawsuit then moved to the Nebraska Supreme Court, where the court ruled in favor that both companies were liable for the explosion and Hammond was awarded $472,500 in legal compensation.
