= Methodist Women's Hospital =

Hospital in Elkhorn, Omaha, Nebraska, U.S.

- Nebraska Methodist Health System

Geography
- Location: 707 N 190th Plaza, Elkhorn, Nebraska, U.S.
- Coordinates: 41.26487429282109°N 96.21221310281094°W

Organisation
- Type: General Acute Care

Services
- Beds: 137 licensed beds

History
- Opened: 2010

Links
- Website: www.bestcare.org/womens-hospital
- Lists: Hospitals in U.S.

Methodist Women's Hospital is a women's hospital in the Elkhorn neighborhood of Omaha, Nebraska, United States. It is one of four hospitals within the Nebraska Methodist Health System. Methodist Women's Hospital has 137 licensed beds. The hospital began construction in 2007 and was completed in 2010.

== History ==
In November 2007, ground was broken for a women's hospital in Elkhorn, Omaha, Nebraska. The hospital would be five stories tall, would 116 beds, and would cost $120 million. The hospital would also have private patient rooms and a level III neonatal intensive care unit. Methodist Women's Hospital officially opened on June 27, 2010. In 2017, a $20 million expansion was completed that expanded the NICU. In 2022, a $16 million was announced that would add 14 additional rooms to the NICU. The addition was completed in February 2024.

== See also ==
- Hospitals in Omaha
- Methodist Hospital (Omaha, Nebraska)
- Methodist Jennie Edmundson Hospital (Council Bluffs, Iowa)
