= Methodist Fremont Health =

District hospital located in Fremont, Nebraska, U.S.

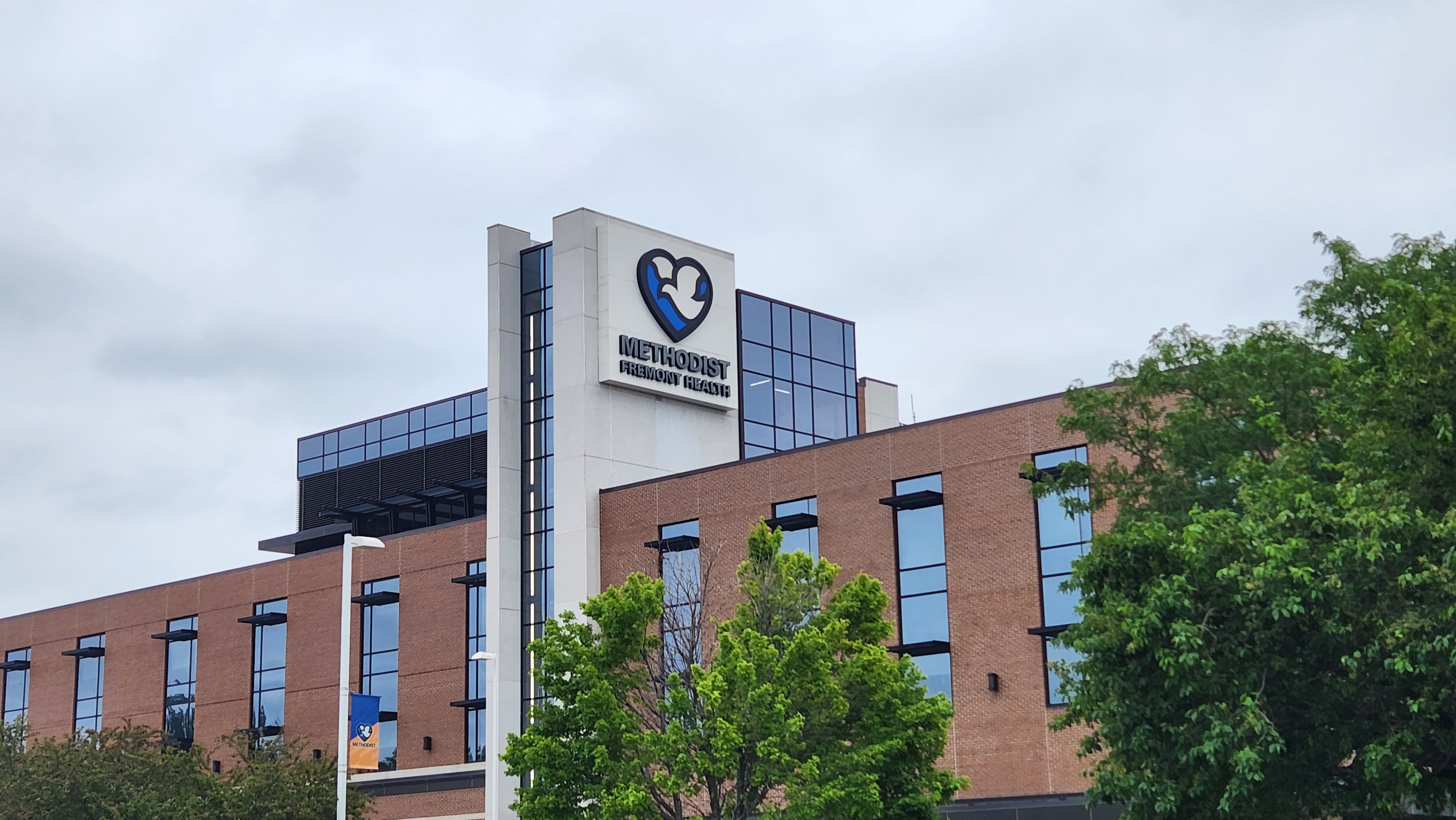

Geography
- Location: 450 E 23rd St St, Fremont, Nebraska, U.S.
- Coordinates: 41.45345°N 96.4913°W

Organisation
- Type: District
- Religious affiliation: Methodist
- Network: Nebraska Methodist Health System

History
- Former names: Dodge County Hospital; Dodge County Community Hospital; Memorial Hospital of Dodge County; Fremont Area Medical Center; Fremont Health
- Opened: 1940

Links
- Website: bestcare.org/locations/methodist-fremont-health/

Methodist Fremont Health is a public district hospital located in Fremont, Nebraska, United States, and the only hospital located in Dodge County. The hospital is an affiliate of the Nebraska Methodist Health System. The hospital opened in 1940 as the Dodge County Hospital. In 1945, the hospital changed its name to the Dodge County Community Hospital. In 1947, an addition known as the West Wing opened, along with updating the original hospital. In 1956, the North Wing opened. In 1960, the long-term care facility, Chronic Disease Annex, now known as Dunklau Gardens, opened. In the 1970s, the hospital changed its name to the Memorial Hospital of Dodge County, was renovated the following year, and founded the hospital foundation.

In 1976, following the Hotel Pathfinder explosion, survivors were transferred to the hospital. In the 1980s, a helipad was added, the fifth floor was completed, and the outpatient area was expanded. In the 1990s, the hospital opened 46 rooms in the skilled care unit, added a radiation oncology unit, added further renovations to the building, and changed its name to Fremont Area Medical Center in 1996. In the 2000s, most renovations were completed, hearing screening tests were introduced, a new emergency center opened, and the East Campus was renovated. In the 2010s, the hospital expanded with new additions, acquiring the Fremont Surgical Center, and joining the Nebraska Health Network.

== History ==
=== Dodge County Hospital/Dodge County Community Hospital ===
Methodist Fremont Health opened as the Dodge County Hospital in 1940. The hospital had its open house May 19 and 21 of that year. In 1945, the hospital changed its name to Dodge County Community Hospital. In 1946, a north wing was announced for the hospital. The original bid of $63,960 for construction was chosen, which was considered low for its time. The following year, construction for the north wing was finished, with the total cost estimated to be $90,000. Following the completion, the original building was also updated.

In 1956, the North Wing of the hospital opened. In 1958, a proposed $1,275,000 long-term care facility, known as the Chronic Disease Annex (now Dunklau Gardens), was announced. Supervisors were requesting for a $500,000 bond issue to help fund the addition. The special election to vote for the Chronic Disease Annex was held on March 4. In 1960, the Chronic Disease Annex opened.

=== Memorial Hospital of Dodge County ===
In 1971, the Dodge County Community Hospital changed its name to Memorial Hospital of Dodge County. The following year, renovations were done to the hospital, including adding a six-story tower being added. In 1976, the Memorial Hospital Foundation was founded.

On January 10, 1976, a natural gas leak explosion occurred at the Hotel Pathfinder in Fremont. The explosion killed 20 people, and injured 40 others. Survivors were immediately transferred to the Memorial Hospital of Dodge County. The hospital claimed it was prepared for the disaster, helping treat all 40 injured patients.

In 1981, a helipad was added, in addition with the fifth floor of the hospital being completed. In 1988, a $500,000 expansion project was announced for the hospital. After the outpatient services started in 1985, expansion was necessary. A morgue and autopsy room were also announced, and were expected for completion in July. By the end of 1988, the outpatient surgery area had doubled in size.

In 1991, an addition of 46 rooms were made to the skilled care unit. In 1992, a radiation oncology unit was opened, with Dr. Janet Soori joining as a medical director. On November 25, 1995, the hospital broke ground for a new Rehabilitation Center.

=== Fremont Area Medical Center ===
Following renovations to the building, the Memorial Hospital of Dodge County changed its name to Fremont Area Medical Center in 1996. That same year, the Rehabilitation Center was renovated, opened December 1, and had its open house on January 15 of the following year. The newly renovated facility included the addition of an aqua therapy pool. In 1998, an $8 million renovation was announced. Ground was broken on August 24, and projects included remodeling the front entrance, and expand the radiology, registration, pharmacy, and surgery areas.

By 2000, all major renovations done at the hospital were completed. In July 2000, Fremont Area Medical Center launched its website. That same year, the hospital launched newborn hearing screening tests. In 2002, the B-Type Natriuretic Peptide (BNP) test was introduced in the hospital. In 2003, a new emergency department was added. In 2007, the hospital purchased a Da Vinci Surgical System, introducing robotic assisted surgery to the hospital. In 2008, the Imaging Center opened and included new MRI machines, CT scan machines, and mammography equipment. In 2007, plans were made to renovate that the east campus of the hospital, but were replaced with building a new campus instead, which opened in 2010.

=== Fremont Health/Methodist Fremont Health ===
Fremont Area Medical Center changed its name to Fremont Health in June 2014. In 2013, construction projects, including a new tower, were announced. In 2014, the Chronic Disease Annex was renamed to Dunklau Gardens. That same year, the hospital acquired the Fremont Surgery Center. In 2015, the renovations and additions were completed. In 2016, Fremont Health joined the Nebraska Health Network. In 2018, with the amalgamation of several other health services, the Nebraska Methodist Health System announced it would be partnering with Fremont Health. The hospital agreed to affiliate with Methodist later that year. After affiliating with Methodist in 2018, the hospital changed its name to Methodist Fremont Health.
