= Love-Larson Opera House =

- U.S. National Register of Historic Places
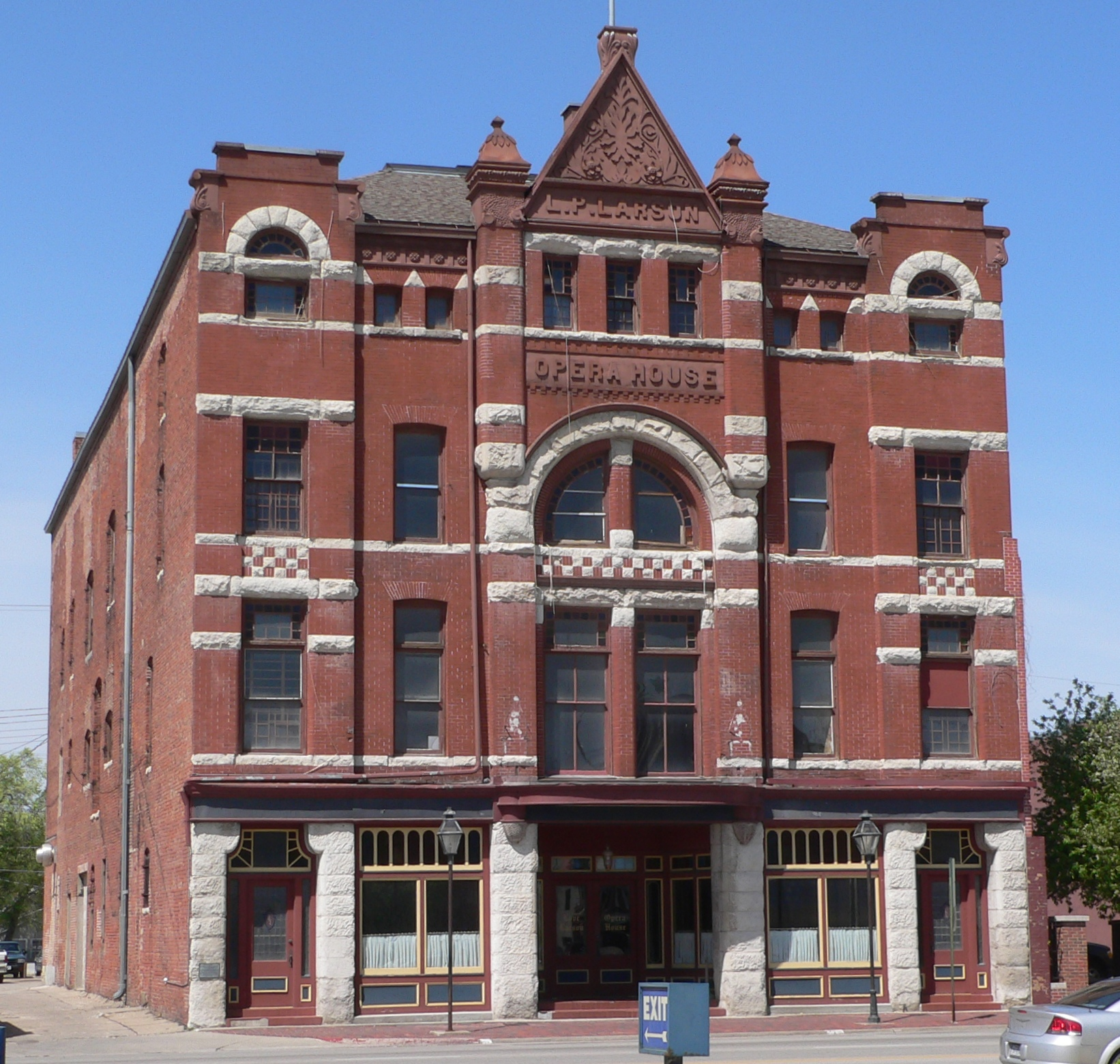
- The building in 2010

- Location within Nebraska Location within the United States
- Location: 543-545 Broad Street, Fremont, Nebraska
- Coordinates: 41°26′04″N 96°29′55″W
- Area: less than one acre
- Built: 1888
- Architect: Francis M. Ellis
- MPS: Opera House Buildings in Nebraska 1867-1917 MPS (AD)
- NRHP reference No.: 74001107
- Added to NRHP: September 10, 1974

The Love-Larson Opera House is a historic building in Fremont, Nebraska. It was built in 1888 by James Wheeler Love, a former educator, to replace a former theatre demolished in 1887. The new building was designed by architect Francis M. Ellis. It was dedicated on December 14, 1888 with a performance by actress Minnie Maddern Fiske. Upon its purchase by L.P. Larson in 1905, it was renamed the L.P. Larson Opera House. It has been listed on the National Register of Historic Places since September 10, 1974.

== History ==
The Love-Larson Opera House was constructed in the aftermath of the fire and demolition of the previous opera house, known as, "Shed's Opera House." The former opera house was built in 1874 and was demolished in 1887. The current opera house was dedicated on December 14, 1888, with a performance by actress Minnie Maddern Fiske.

In 1905, the building was purchased by L.P. Larson and was then renovated. The opera house was also renamed to, "L.P. Larson Opera House."

In February 1974, it was announced that the local historical society had intent to restore the building and list it on the National Register of Historic Places. Later that year, on September 10, 1974, the opera house became the first building listed on the National Register of Historic Places.

The opera house was located directly across the street from the Hotel Pathfinder explosion, which happened on January 10, 1976, and was damaged because of it. However, it remained structurally sound. In June, five months after the explosion, work on repairs to the opera house started.

In 1981, renovations to the first floor were completed.

In 2011, the first floor was renovated, adding a small-scale theatre.
