= Immanuel Medical Center =

- CHI Health

Geography
- Location: Omaha, Nebraska, United States

Organization
- Funding: Non-profit organization
- Patron: E. A. Fogelstrom

History
- Opened: December 1890

Links
- Website: www.chihealth.com/immanuel-medical-center
- Lists: Hospitals in Nebraska

Immanuel Medical Center is a hospital located in Omaha, Nebraska. It is part of CHI Health.

== History ==
In 1879, Erik Alfred Fogelstrom came to Nebraska to serve the Swedish population in Omaha as pastor of Immanuel Lutheran Church. On October 8, 1887, Fogelstrom and others organized the Evangelical Lutheran Immanuel Association for Works for Charity. In December 1890, the hospital was completed and the first four deaconesses began their work at the hospital.

The community's needs outpaced the first hospital, located at 36th and Meredith, and a new hospital was opened in 1910 in the same area. The original building became the Nazareth Home, which served people who were elderly and those who had severe disabilities. The need for hospital beds continued to grow and a third hospital was opened on the 36th and Meredith site in 1926. The first two buildings were remodeled and services for the elderly and those with disabilities were expanded. During the 1950s there was a period of growth and reconstruction, and a six-story hospital wing doubled the size of the hospital.

Planning for the current Immanuel Medical Center began in the early 1960s when it became apparent that, in order to meet its healthcare commitments, Immanuel would have to expand. The present 166-acre (67 ha) site at 72nd and Sorensen Parkway was purchased in 1966. The new Immanuel Medical Center opened on June 29, 1974. Recognizing the benefits of alliances in healthcare, Bergan Mercy Health System and Immanuel Medical Center came together to form Alegent Health (now CHI Health) in June 1996.

== See also ==
- Hospitals in Omaha, Nebraska
