= OrthoNebraska =

Orthopedic healthcare system in Omaha, Nebraska, U.S.

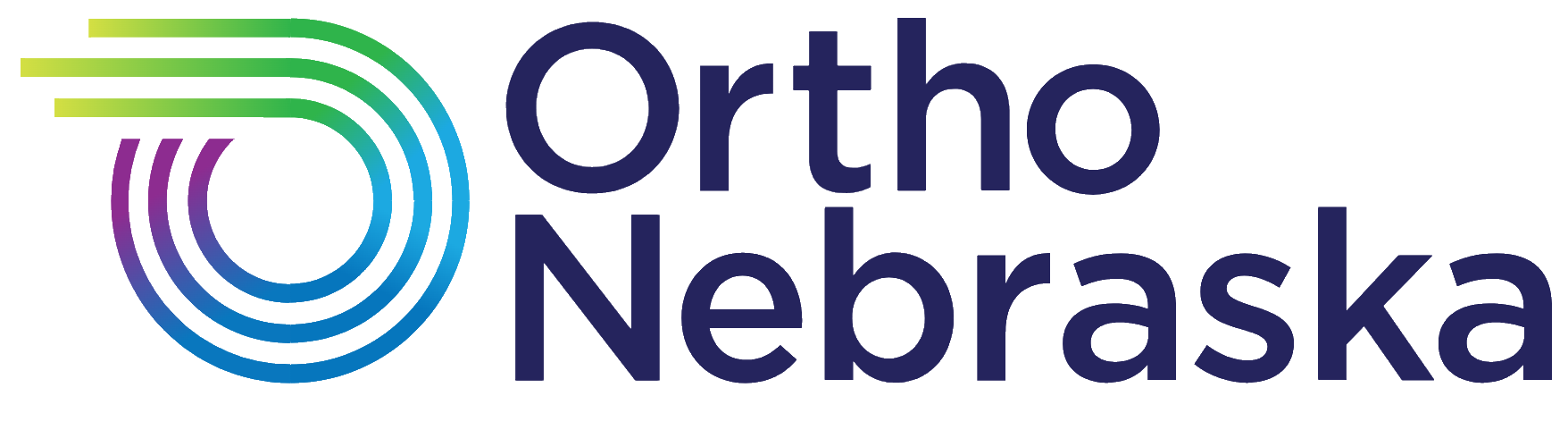

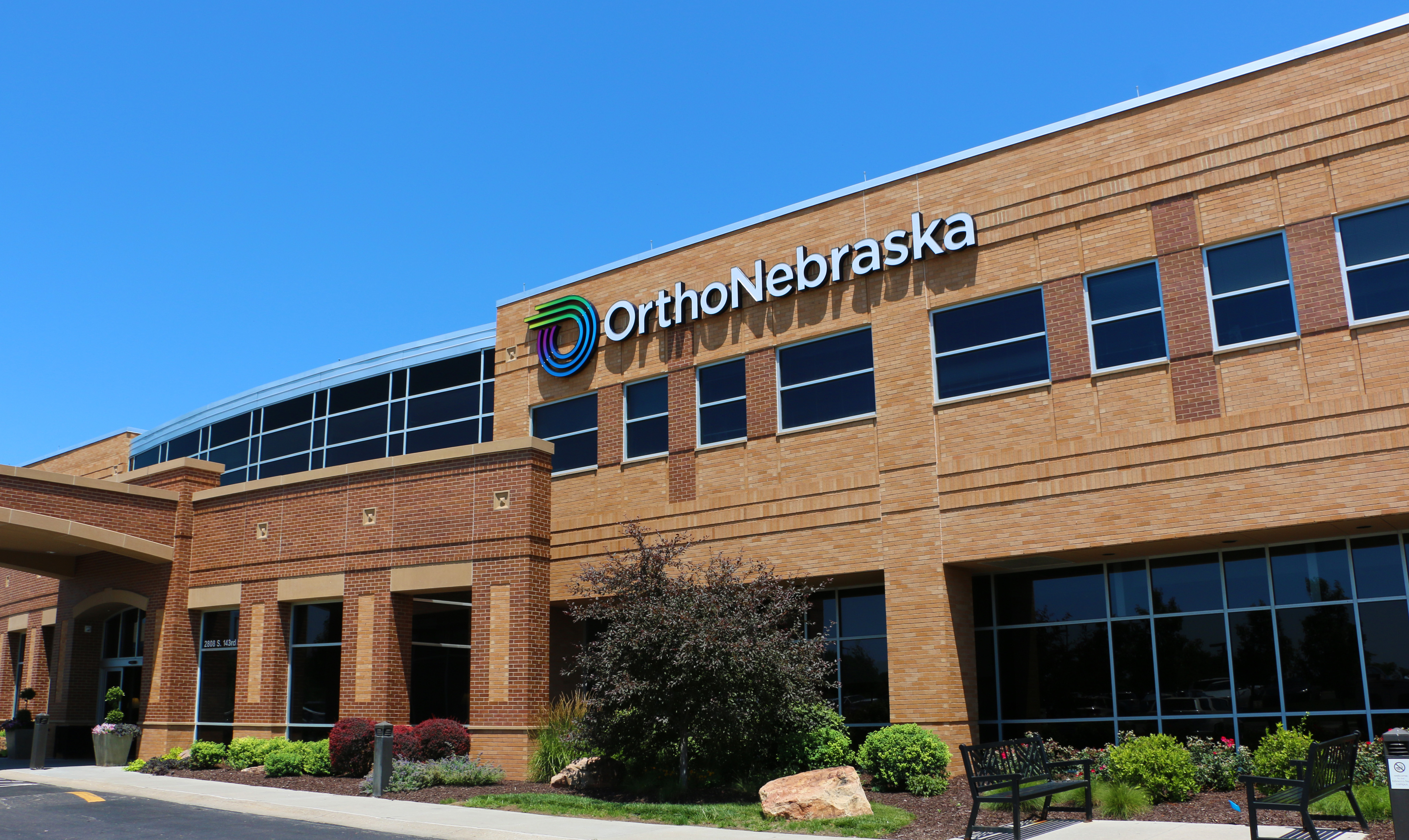
- The main OrthoNebraska hospital in 2022
- Company type: Private
- Industry: Orthopedic medicine
- Founded: 2017; 8 years ago
- Headquarters: 2808 So. 143rd Plaza, Omaha, Nebraska, U.S.
- Website: orthonebraska.com

OrthoNebraska is an orthopedic health system in Omaha, Nebraska, United States. The main hospital in West Omaha is licensed as an acute care hospital by the State of Nebraska and fully accredited by The Joint Commission. OrthoNebraska's legal name is Nebraska Orthopaedic Hospital, LLC. The hospital system was formed in 2017 from the merger of the Nebraska Orthopaedic Hospital and OrthoWest.

The system was recognized as a top orthopaedic provider by U.S. News & World Report on two occasions. In 2011, Nebraska Orthopaedic Hospital was recognized as the 38th-best hospital in the nation for orthopaedic care, and #1 in the Omaha/Council Bluffs metro region.

== History ==
OrthoNebraska, then known as the Nebraska Orthopaedic Hospital, was announced after seven orthopedic surgeons left the Nebraska Methodist Health System in 2002 to affiliate with a specialty hospital in West Omaha. The $18 million facility was completed and the Nebraska Orthopaedic Hospital opened in April 2004. The hospital was owned by the practicing orthopedic surgeons and Nebraska Medicine.

In 2017, Nebraska Orthopaedic Hospital and OrthoWest, another orthopedic practice, merged to create the current health system, known as OrthoNebraska. In 2018, OrthoNebraska was one of 200 victims of the ransomware SamSam and paid $2,000 in ransom. In 2019, a woman accused OrthoNebraska of using her to see if a doctor was inappropriately touching female patients without her consent or prior knowledge.

In August 2023, it was announced that InTandem Capital made a strategic investment in OrthoNebraska. In November 2024, it was announced that a new facility would be built in Northwest Omaha, and expansions to the facility in Elkhorn, Nebraska.

== Facilities ==
OrthoNebraska primarily serves the Omaha–Council Bluffs metropolitan area. OrthoNebraska's main hospital is located near Oak View Mall in 2808 So. 143rd Plaza, Omaha, Nebraska, United States. OrthoNebraska also has locations in Council Bluffs, Papillion, Elkhorn, Northwest Omaha, and Millard. OrthoNebraska also includes satellite facilities in Nebraska City and Norfolk.
