= Methodist Hospital (Omaha, Nebraska) =

General hospital in Omaha, Nebraska, U.S.

- Nebraska Methodist Health System

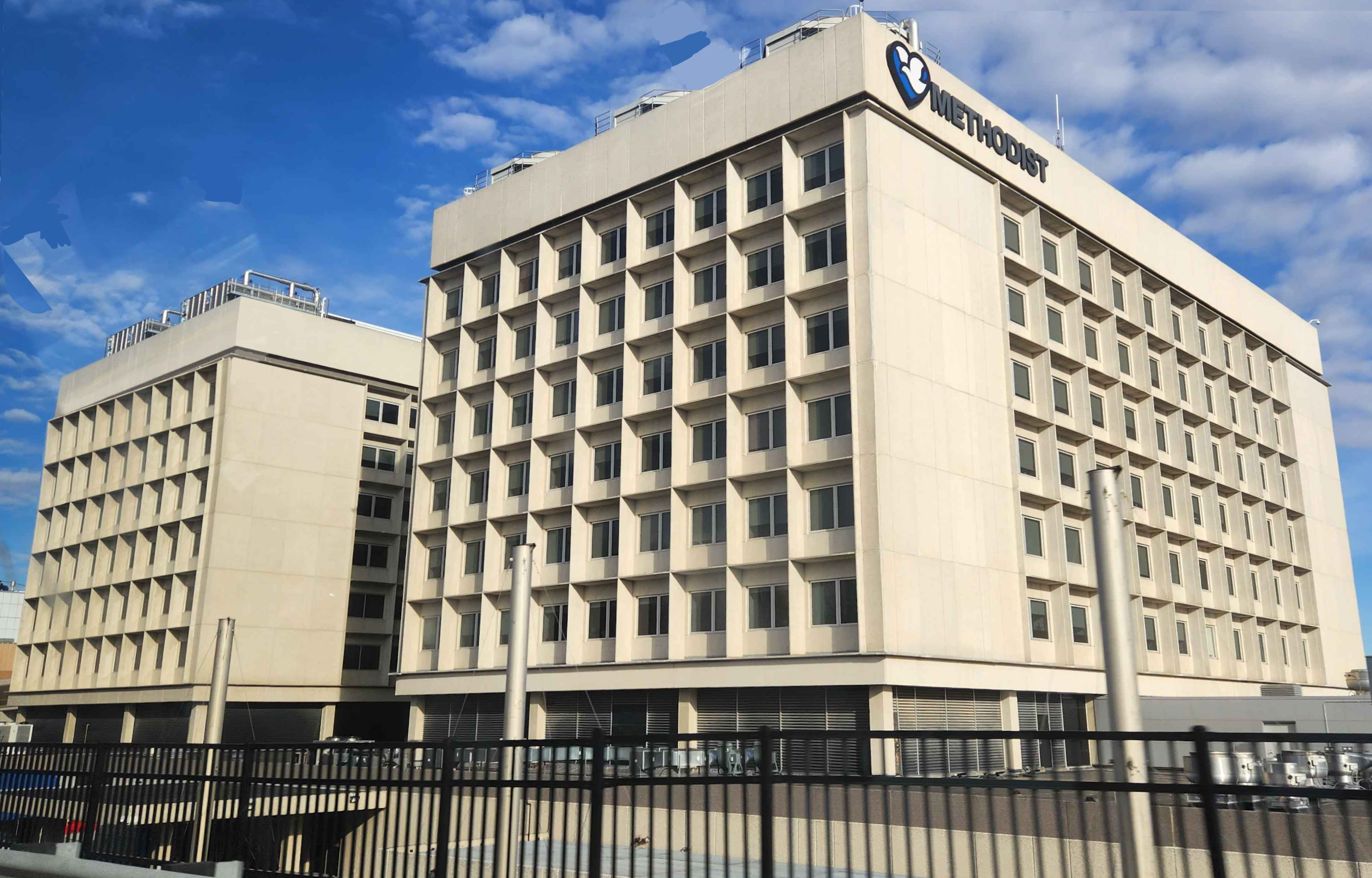
- Methodist Hospital in 2025

Geography
- Location: 8303 Dodge St., Omaha, Nebraska, U.S.
- Coordinates: 41.2589190280616°N 96.04203574844222°W

Organisation
- Type: General hospital

Services
- Beds: 374

History
- Opened: 1891

Links
- Website: www.bestcare.org/methodist-hospital
- Other links: Hospitals in Omaha

Methodist Hospital is a general hospital located at 8303 Dodge St., Omaha, Nebraska, United States. It is one of four major facilities comprising the Nebraska Methodist Health System. The hospital includes over 2,000 full-time employees and 400 physicians on active staff. Methodist's services include cardiovascular surgery, neurosurgery, women's services, cancer care, gastroenterology, orthopedics, and comprehensive diagnostic services.

It was the first hospital in Nebraska to earn Magnet designation for nursing excellence from the American Nurses Credentialing Center. The hospital was established in 1891 and was originally located in a small three-story house. The hospital then moved to a larger location in 1908. The hospital moved to its current location in 1968 with a single hospital tower. In 1981 a second hospital tower opened, adjacent to the first.

== History ==
The original Methodist Hospital in Omaha was announced in 1890. The original hospital was located at a small three-story house at 20th and Harney Streets. The building was renovated for hospital usage and opened in May 1891. In 1900, it was announced that the hospital would build a new location at 36th and Cuming Streets. Due to many delays and disputes over plans, construction did not begin until 1906. The hospital was officially dedicated in June 1908.

The hospital was announced in May 1964 as a replacement for the previous Methodist Hospital, which opened in 1891. Fundraising began in 1965 and was completed later that year. Construction began in 1966 and the hospital officially opened in 1968. The hospital originally opened with a single hospital tower, containing 328 beds. The hospital also purchased land to the North, which would later be used to build the North Tower. After the hospital moved, the previous location was converted into an extended care facility known as Eppley Care Center.

In 1976, Methodist announced that it would be building a second tower, identical to the first. The announcement was made in partnership with Children's Hospital, which planned on using some floors as a new children's hospital. The addition was having issues with state approval, with the Nebraska Health Department deciding that it was not needed. Children's and Methodist then filed a lawsuit attempting to receive approval. On August 19, 1978, U.S. District Judge Warren Keith Urbom ruled in favor of construction. The North Tower officially opened in 1981, and was used by Children's until 2000.

In 1993, the hospital began major renovations. Plans included updating the South Tower and would reduce the total number of beds from 129 to 430. During renovations in 2000, Children's Hospital moved out of the North Tower and moved into a separate facility across the street. Children's announced that it would still occupy some of the building. Methodist then announced further renovations to make up for the lost space from Children's, including turning the sixth floor into an inpatient nursing ward. In the late 2000s, the original visitor parking garage was demolished and was replaced with a five-story parking garage that opened in March 2008.

== See also ==
- Methodist Jennie Edmundson Hospital (Council Bluffs, Iowa)
- Methodist Women's Hospital
