= St. Elizabeth Regional Medical Center =

General hospital in Lincoln, Nebraska, U.S.

- CHI Health
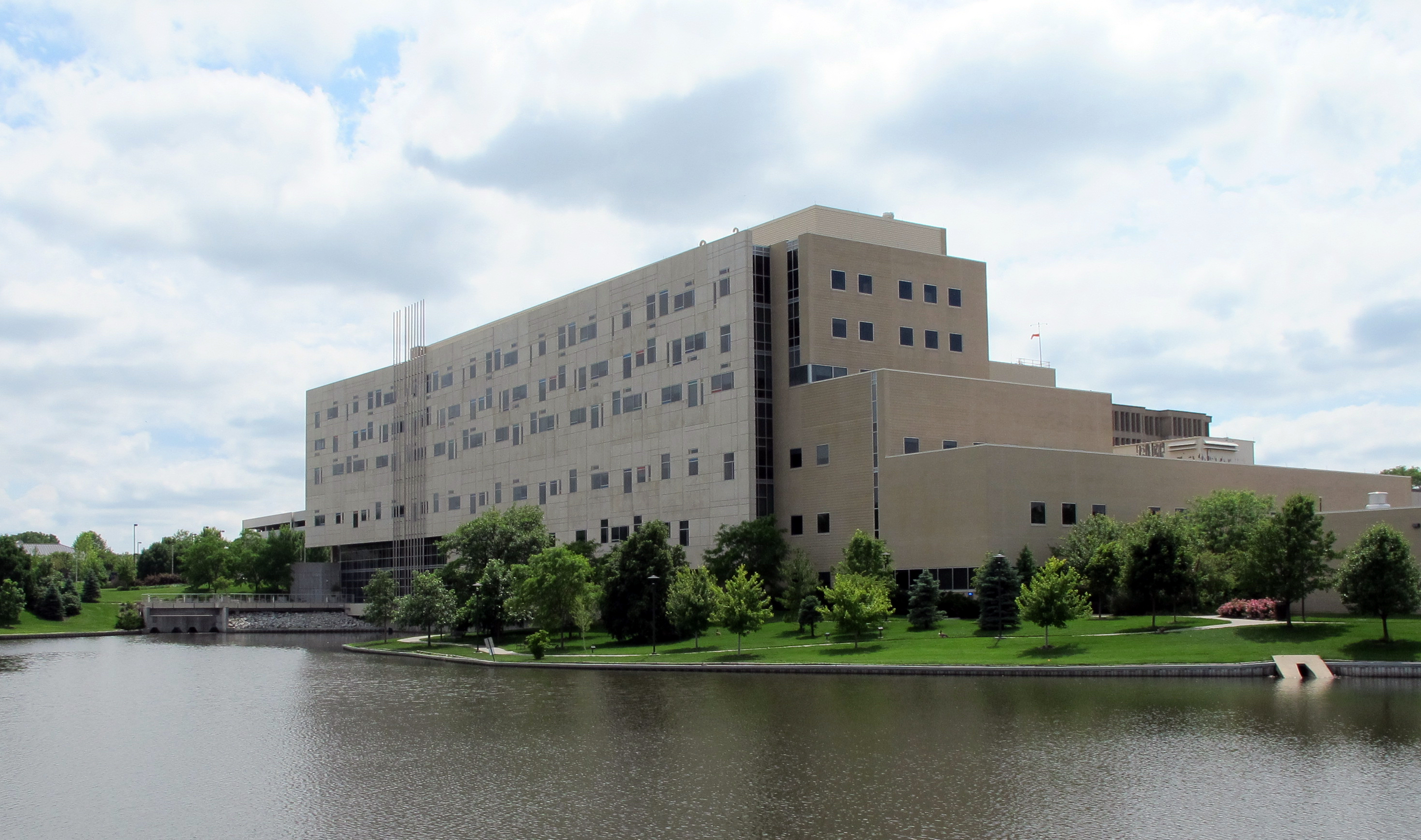
- St. Elizabeth Regional Medical Center in 2015

Geography
- Location: Lincoln, Nebraska, U.S.
- Coordinates: 40°48′30″N 96°37′37″W

Services
- Beds: 258

History
- Opened: 1889

Links
- Website: www.saintelizabethonline.com

St. Elizabeth's Regional Medical Center is a general acute care licensed hospital located at 555 South 70th Street in Lincoln, Nebraska, United States. It is a part of CHI Health, a hospital network based in Omaha. As of 2022 the hospital has 258 staffed beds. The hospital was founded in 1889 by the St. Francis of Perpetual Adoration. Originally located in Buckstaff Place, the hospital moved across the block in 1893 and moved to its current location in 1970. The hospital underwent a major expansion that was completed in 2004.

== History ==
This hospital was originally founded by the Sisters of St. Francis of Perpetual Adoration in 1889. The hospital was originally located in Buckstaff Place at Eleventh and South Streets. In 1893, the hospital moved to a new location, also on Eleventh and South Streets. In 1905, a second story was added to the hospital. In 1913, a four story addition was built adjacent of the hospital. In 1921, the East-wing opened. In October 1953, the South-wing of the hospital opened.

The hospital announced that it would be moving to its now-current location in 1966. The hospital broke ground for the new location in July 1967. The location opened in May 1970 and had 208 beds, which was fewer beds compared to the previous location, which had 265. The hospital underwent renovations in 1986. In June 1990, a $4.7 million expansion that would add an intensive care unit was announced. The expansion began construction in 1991 and was completed in 1992.

In January 2001, a $110 million expansion to the hospital was announced. The expansion would add a new hospital tower, new offices, and a new emergency room. The expansion would also add a new parking garage. The expansion was completed in May 2004 later added a sculpture to the front of the hospital tower. In 2019, the former adult observation area was renovated into the Pediatric Place, a special type of emergency room designed for children. The Regional Wound and Burn Center was renovated in 2024.
