= Creighton University Medical Center - Saint Joseph =

Former general hospital in Omaha, Nebraska, U.S.

Creighton University Medical Center - Saint Joseph Hospital
- CHI Health

Geography
- Location: 2929 California Plz., Omaha, Nebraska, U.S.
- Coordinates: 41°15′55″N 95°57′18″W

Organisation
- Care system: Private
- Affiliated university: Creighton University

Services
- Emergency department: Level I Trauma Center
- Beds: 396

Helipads
- Helipad: Yes

History
- Founded: 1870
- Closed: 2017

Links
- Website: www.chihealth.com
- Lists: Hospitals in U.S.

Creighton University Medical Center - Saint Joseph Hospital was a general hospital located in Omaha, Nebraska, United States. The hospital was a part of the CHI Health system. The hospital was originally established in 1870 by the Sisters of Mercy. It later came under control of Creighton University in 1973. The hospital was sold to Alegent Health in 2012 and closed in 2017.

== History ==
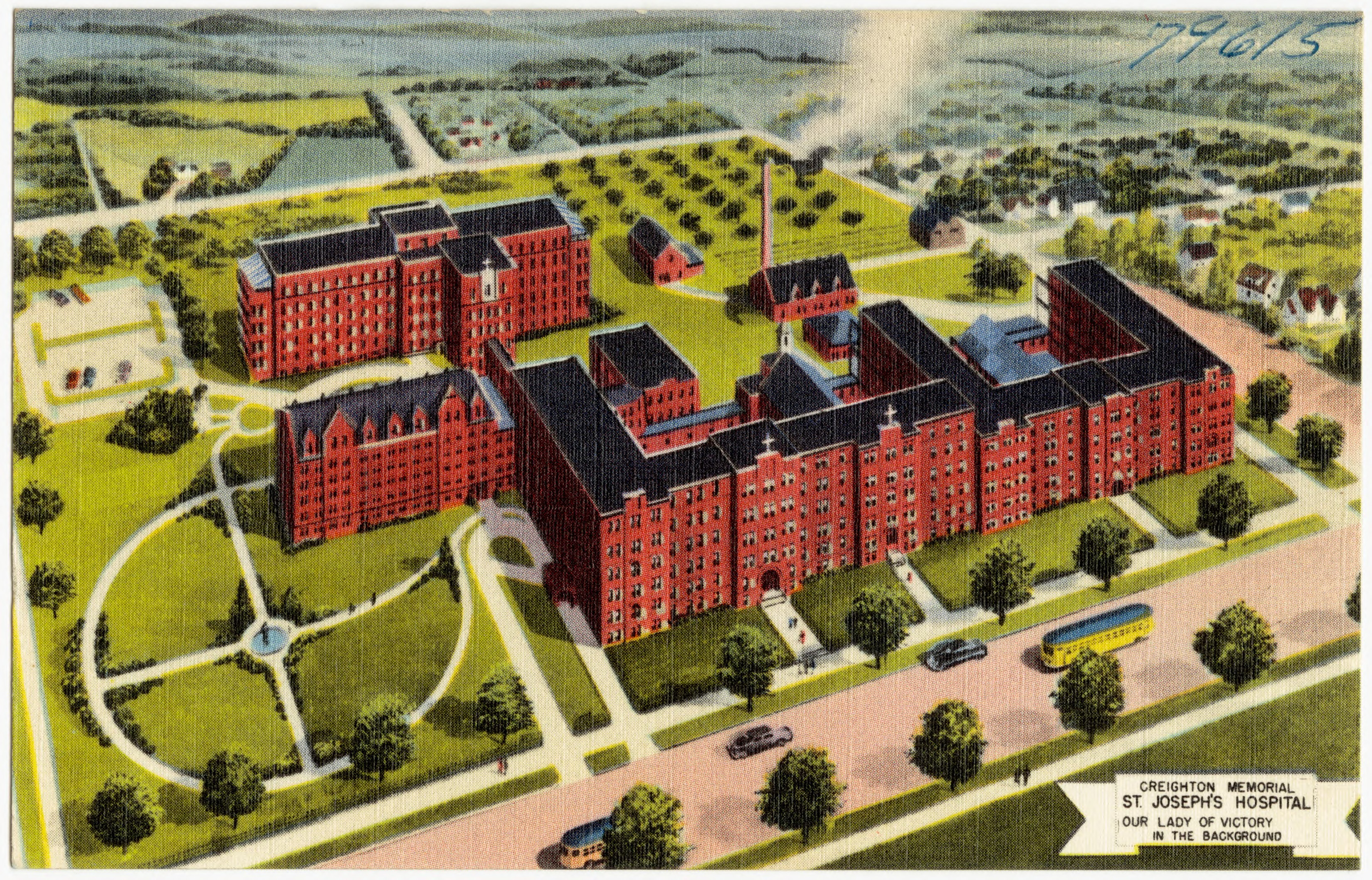
St. Joseph's Memorial Hospital (1930–1945)

St. Joseph's Mercy Hospital was founded on September 25, 1870, at 12th and Mason Streets by the Sisters of Mercy. The original hospital was known as Creighton Memorial and was a plain wood-frame building with two wards and ten rooms. In 1880, the Sisters of St. Francis took over management of the hospital and renamed it to Creighton Memorial Hospital.

By 1882 an addition was required to keep up with care demands. In 1892, John A. Creighton established the John A. Creighton Medical College along with a 200-bed hospital. The new hospital was built at 10th and Castelar Streets at a cost of $200,000, and changed its name to Creighton Memorial St. Joseph Hospital. At this time, the hospital became the primary resource for clinical instruction in the medical school.

In 1973, the Sisters of Saint Francis transferred ownership of the hospital to the Creighton Omaha Regional Health Care Corporation, an affiliate of Creighton University. Alongside the transfer, it was announced that a new building would be built to house the hospital. The facility later opened in December 1977. American Medical International acquired St. Joseph Hospital in 1984; Tenet Healthcare acquired American Medical in 1995. In 2008, after the Nebraska State Legislature passed its safe-haven law, a man abandoned nine of his children at the hospital. The law allowed individuals to surrender their children without facing criminal charges, and had been misinterpreted to mean any child below the age of 18.

In 2012, Tenent and Creighton University sold the hospital to Alegent Health. Following the merger of its parent company with CHI Nebraska, the hospital re-branded under CHI. CHI Health closed the building in June 2017, moving its trauma services to Creighton University Medical Center - Bergan Mercy and opening its University Campus location at 2412 Cuming Street. The new facility has an emergency department, several observation rooms, a pharmacy and various outpatient clinics. The building was later sold to developers, and the building was renovated into Atlas Apartments, which opened in 2018.
