= Nebraska Methodist Health System =

American regional nonprofit healthcare organization

- Company type: Private
- Industry: Healthcare
- Founded: 1982; 44 years ago, in Omaha, Nebraska, U.S.
- Headquarters: Omaha, Nebraska, U.S.
- Area served: Omaha, NE and surrounding area
- Key people: Steve Goeser (CEO and president)
- Website: bestcare.org

The Nebraska Methodist Health System (NMHS) is an American nonprofit healthcare organization based in Omaha, Nebraska, United States. The organization was formed in 1982 to oversee operations of its flagship hospital in Central Omaha and has since expanded to two hospitals and two affiliate hospitals. The Nebraska Methodist Health System also operates the Methodist Physicians Clinics, which primarily serve the Omaha–Council Bluffs metropolitan area and surrounding areas. It is also affiliated with the Nebraska Methodist College.

== History ==
The Nebraska Methodist Health System was formed in 1982 by the Methodist Hospital to oversee the hospital and clinics operations. The system was created to support the creation of new facilities, including new for-profit and not-for-profit hospitals. At the time of its creation, Methodist Hospital would be directed by a separate board. Methodist Hospital itself was founded in 1891 by the Methodist Church. In 1990, the system purchased Physicians Clinic, a medical practice group based in Omaha. Following the purchase, the system re-branded the group to the Methodist Physicians Clinic and began expanding to new locations.

In 1994, the Nebraska Methodist Health System began affiliations with the Jennie Edmundson Hospital in Council Bluffs, Iowa. In 2010, the system opened the Methodist Women's Hospital in the Elkhorn neighborhood of Omaha. In 2018, the system began affiliations with Fremont Health Medical Center in Fremont and re-branded it to Methodist Fremont Health. The COVID-19 pandemic resulted in a no-visitor policy, beginning in March 2020, for patients at NMHS hospitals. That June, the system's Methodist Jennie Edmundson Hospital opened a new 63,144-square-foot medical office building on its campus in Council Bluffs, Iowa. While the COVID-19 vaccine was being developed, NMHS introduced conversational AI for in-coming patient calls, anticipating a high-volume influx of inquiries.

== Operations ==
The Nebraska Methodist Health System operates as a non-profit healthcare organization, with 685 beds within its system. Facilities offer programs in obstetrics, neurology, cancer care, cardiology, rehabilitation, and geriatric care. The system owns the main hospital Methodist Hospital and Methodist Women's Hospital in Omaha and the Elkhorn neighborhood of Omaha. The system is also affiliated with the Methodist Jennie Edmundson Hospital and Methodist Fremont Health in Council Bluffs, Iowa and Fremont. The Methodist Health System is affiliated with the Nebraska Methodist College.

== Partnerships ==
Nebraska Methodist has partnered with for-profit behavior health operator Acadia Healthcare to operate some of its facilities. In August 2024, Jennie Edmundson Hospital and Acadia Healthcare broke ground on 24th Street in Council Bluffs, Iowa for the construction of the Methodist Jennie Edmundson Behavioral Health Hospital. Expected to open in 2026, the new hospital aims to care for residents of western Iowa and eastern Nebraska.

== See also ==
- Hospitals in Omaha
- Methodist Jennie Edmundson Hospital (Council Bluffs, Iowa)
- Methodist Women's Hospital (Elkhorn, Nebraska)
- Methodist Hospital (Omaha, Nebraska)
- Methodist Fremont Health
