= Creighton University Medical Center - Bergan Mercy =

Hospital in Omaha, Nebraska, U.S.

- CHI Health

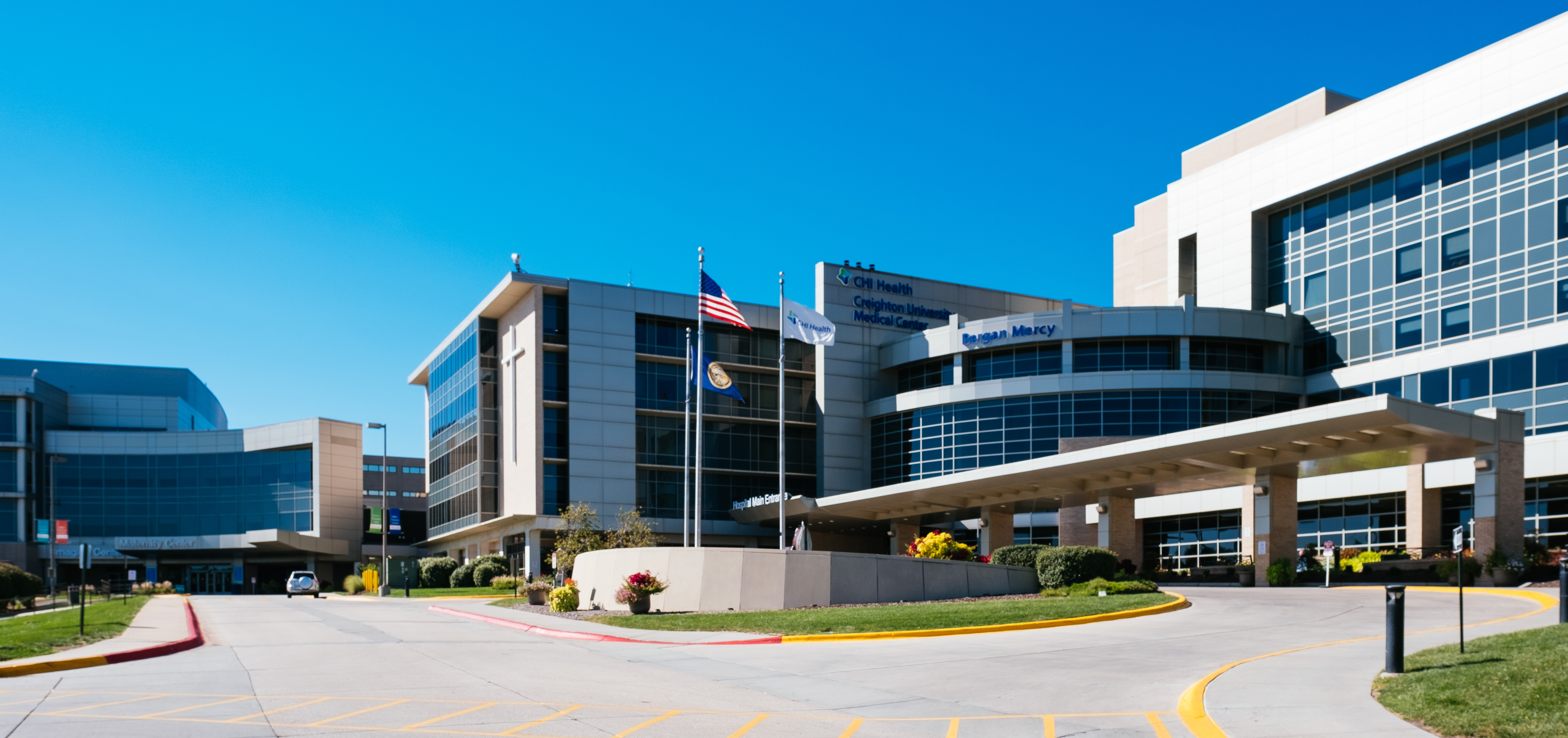
- The hospital in 2018

Geography
- Location: 7500 Mercy Road, Omaha, Nebraska, U.S.
- Coordinates: 41.239450°N 96.030811°W

Organisation
- Care system: Private
- Affiliated university: Creighton University

Services
- Emergency department: Level I Trauma Center
- Beds: 396

Helipads
- Helipad: Yes

History
- Founded: 1910; 116 years ago

Links
- Website: www.chihealth.com
- Lists: Hospitals in U.S.

Creighton University Medical Center - Bergan Mercy is a hospital located in Central Omaha, Nebraska, United States. A level I Trauma Center, the hospital is a part of the CHI Health system, and is affiliated with the Creighton University School of Medicine. The hospital was originally established in 1910 and re-branded under the Bergan name in 1964.

== History ==
=== Background ===
Creighton University Medical Center was originally formed in 1973 when Saint Joseph Hospital came under the control of Creighton University for use by its school of medicine. The name "Creighton University Medical Center" came into official use in 1987.

=== Development ===
The hospital was originally founded as St. Catherine's Hospital in 1910. The hospital was founded by the Sisters' of Mercy. In 1959, it was announced that a new hospital would be built, and that its name would be changed to Archbishop Bergan Mercy Hospital. Named for Gerald T. Bergan, he was the former Archbishop of Omaha. The hospital began construction the following year and officially opened in January 1964.

In the late 1970s, the hospital added an East wing to the building. Additionally the McAuley Bergan Center opened in 1972. The Mercy Care Center opened in 1977 and was adjacent to the hospital. In 1992, the hospital began collaborative efforts with Immanuel Medical Center. Four years later, the hospital merged with it to form Alegent Health. Following the merger, the hospital changed its name to Alegent Health Bergan Mercy.

In 2014, Alegent Health merged into CHI Nebraska, rebranding to CHI Health. Additionally, the hospital rebranded to Creighton University Medical Center - Bergan Mercy. In 2017, CHI closed Saint Joseph Hospital, and consolidated it into Bergan Mercy. Following the merger, a new trauma center was built close to the original site of the hospital, and is currently used by Bergan Mercy.

== Services ==
Creighton University Medical Center - Bergan Mercy is a Level I trauma center and has 396 beds. The hospital is owned by CHI Health and is affiliated with the Creighton University School of Medicine.

== See also ==
- CHI Health
- List of hospitals in Omaha, Nebraska
