= CHI Health =

Regional healthcare network in Omaha, Nebraska, U.S.

- Type: Subsidiary
- Industry: Healthcare
- Founded: 1996; 30 years ago
- Headquarters: Omaha, Nebraska, U.S.
- Area served: Iowa, Nebraska
- Key people: E.J. Kuiper (CEO)
- Parent: CommonSpirit Health
- Website: chihealth.com

CHI Health (formerly Alegent Health) is an American regional healthcare network based in Omaha, Nebraska, United States. The combined organization consists of 28 hospitals, two stand-alone behavioral health facilities, and more than 150 employed physician practices in Iowa, Minnesota, Nebraska, and North Dakota. CHI Health is part of CommonSpirit Health and is legally designated a non-profit organization.

== History ==
CHI Health was formed in 1996 as Alegent Health as the result of a merger of Bergan Mercy Medical Center and Immanuel Medical Center. The combined entity included the two hospitals and the Mercy Hospital in Council Bluffs, Iowa, Memorial Hospital in Schuyler, and Mercy Hospital in Corning, Iowa. The network later purchased Midlands Hospital in Papillion, Nebraska in 1997.

In 2012, Alegent Health began an affiliation with Creighton University and purchased their hospital. As part of the purchase, Alegent Health rebranded to Alegent Creighton Health in September of that same year. In 2014, its parent company, Catholic Health Initiatives, merged it into CHI Nebraska. Following the merger, the combined entity became known as CHI Health. After its parent company merged with Dignity Health in February 2019, ownership was transferred to the combined entity, now known as CommonSpirit Health.

== Hospitals ==
Hospital	City	State	Founded	Acquired	Acquired from	Ref.
CHI Health Lakeside	Omaha	Nebraska	2004			
CHI Health Midlands	Papillion	Nebraska	1903	1997		
Community Memorial Hospital	Missouri Valley	Iowa				
Creighton University Medical Center - Bergan Mercy (formerly Bergan Mercy Medical Center)	Omaha	Nebraska	Sisters of Mercy (1870)	2012	Tenet Healthcare and Creighton University	
Good Samaritan Hospital	Kearney	Nebraska	1924	2014	Merger with CHI Nebraska	
Immanuel Medical Center	Omaha	Nebraska	1890	1996	Immanuel Health Systems (Nebraska Synod ELCA)	
Memorial Hospital	Schuyler	Nebraska	1953	1996	Immanuel Health Systems (Nebraska Synod ELCA)	
Mercy Hospital	Corning	Iowa		1996	Sisters of Mercy	
Mercy Hospital	Council Bluffs	Iowa	1887	1996	Sisters of Mercy	
Nebraska Heart Hospital	Lincoln	Nebraska	2003	2014	Merger with CHI Nebraska	
Plainview Hospital	Plainview	Nebraska	1968			
Saint Elizabeth Regional Medical Center	Lincoln	Nebraska	1889	2014	Merger with CHI Nebraska	
Saint Francis Medical Center	Grand Island	Nebraska	1887	2014	Merger with CHI Nebraska	
Saint Mary's Community Hospital	Nebraska City	Nebraska	1927	2014	Merger with CHI Nebraska	

== See also ==
- Hospitals in Omaha, Nebraska
- CHI Health Center Omaha, the city's largest indoor sports venue, bearing the company's name due to a sponsorship deal
