= List of hospitals in Nebraska =

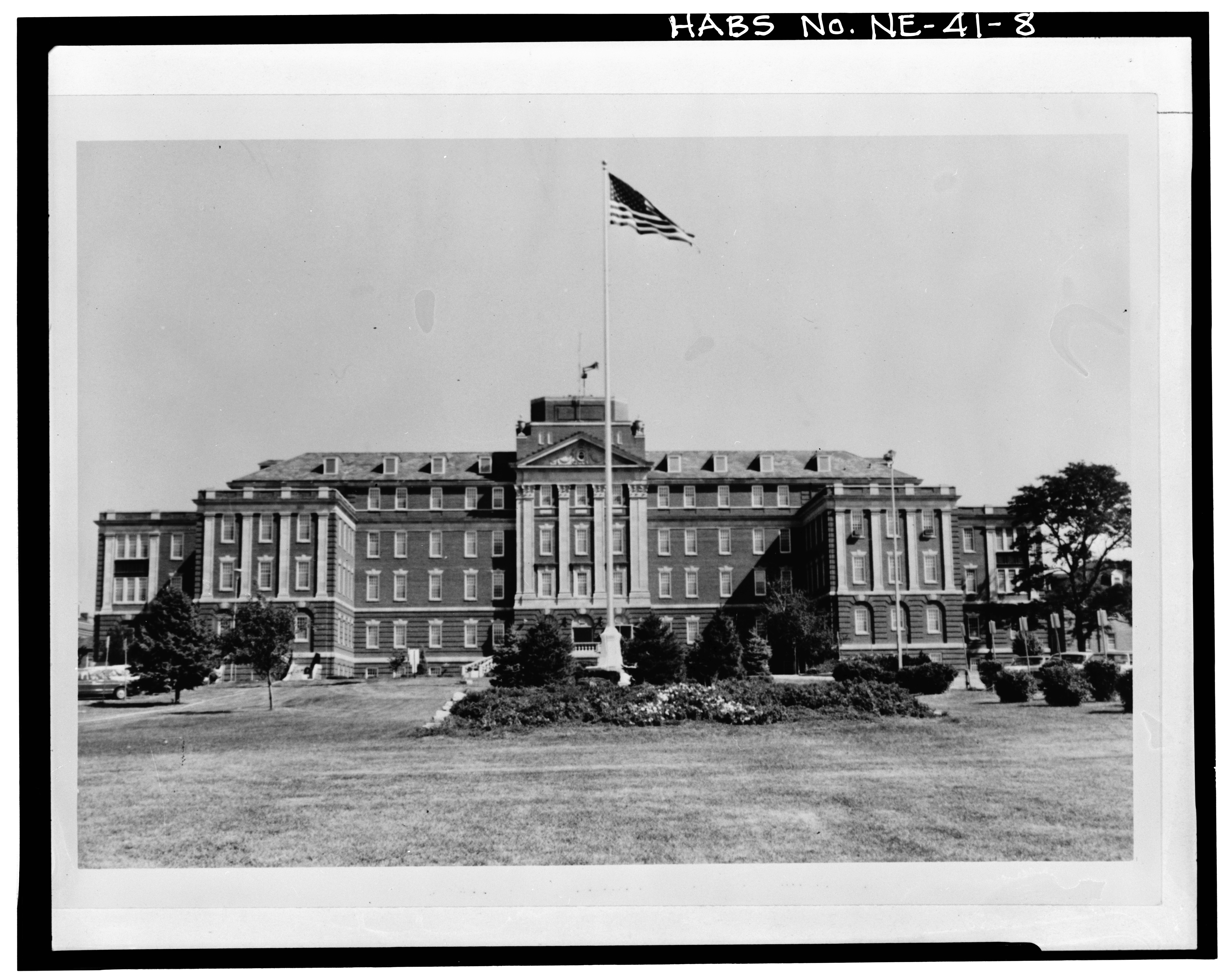
VA Medical Center, Lincoln (1980)

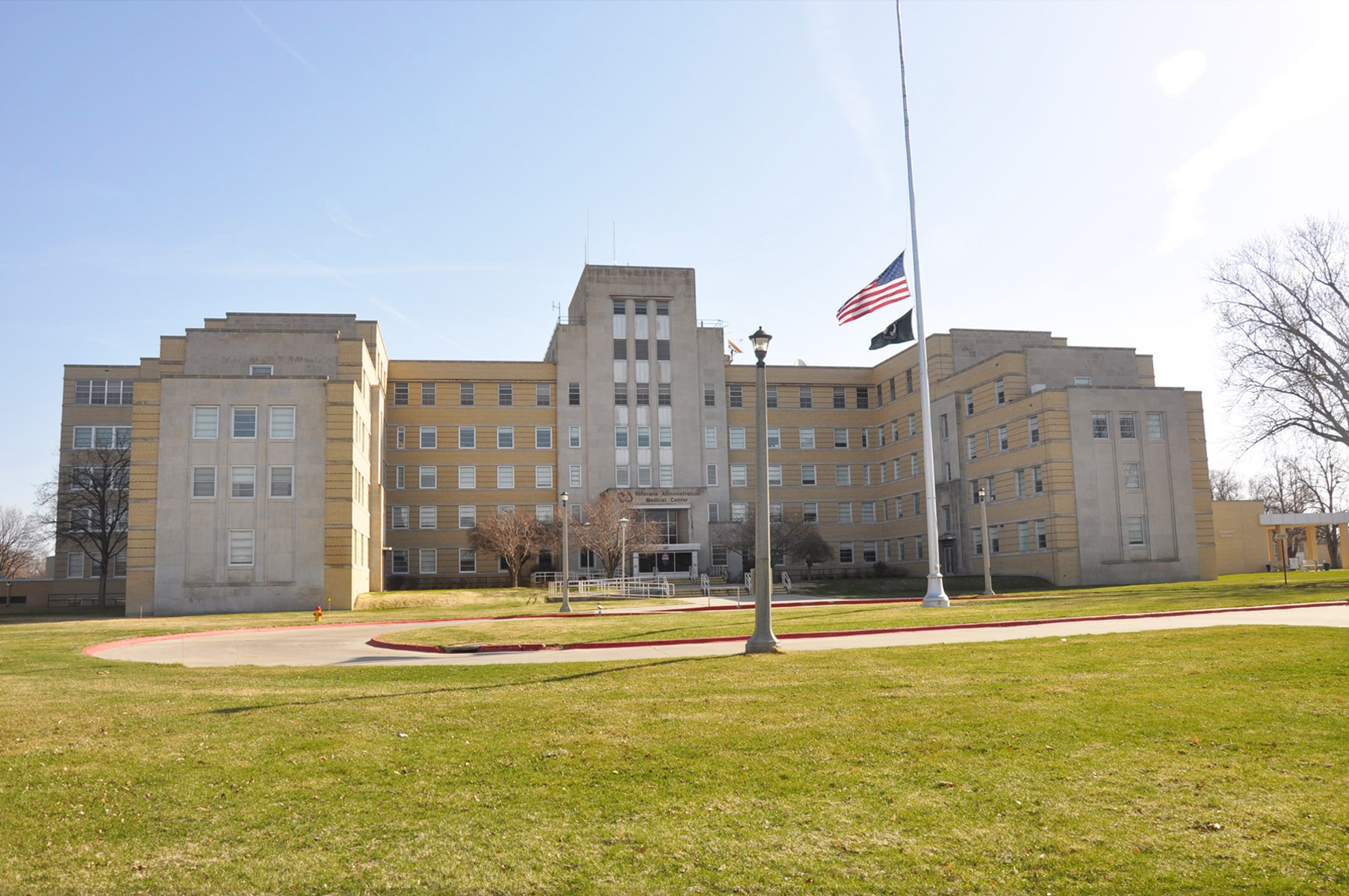
VA Medical Center, Grand Island (2021)

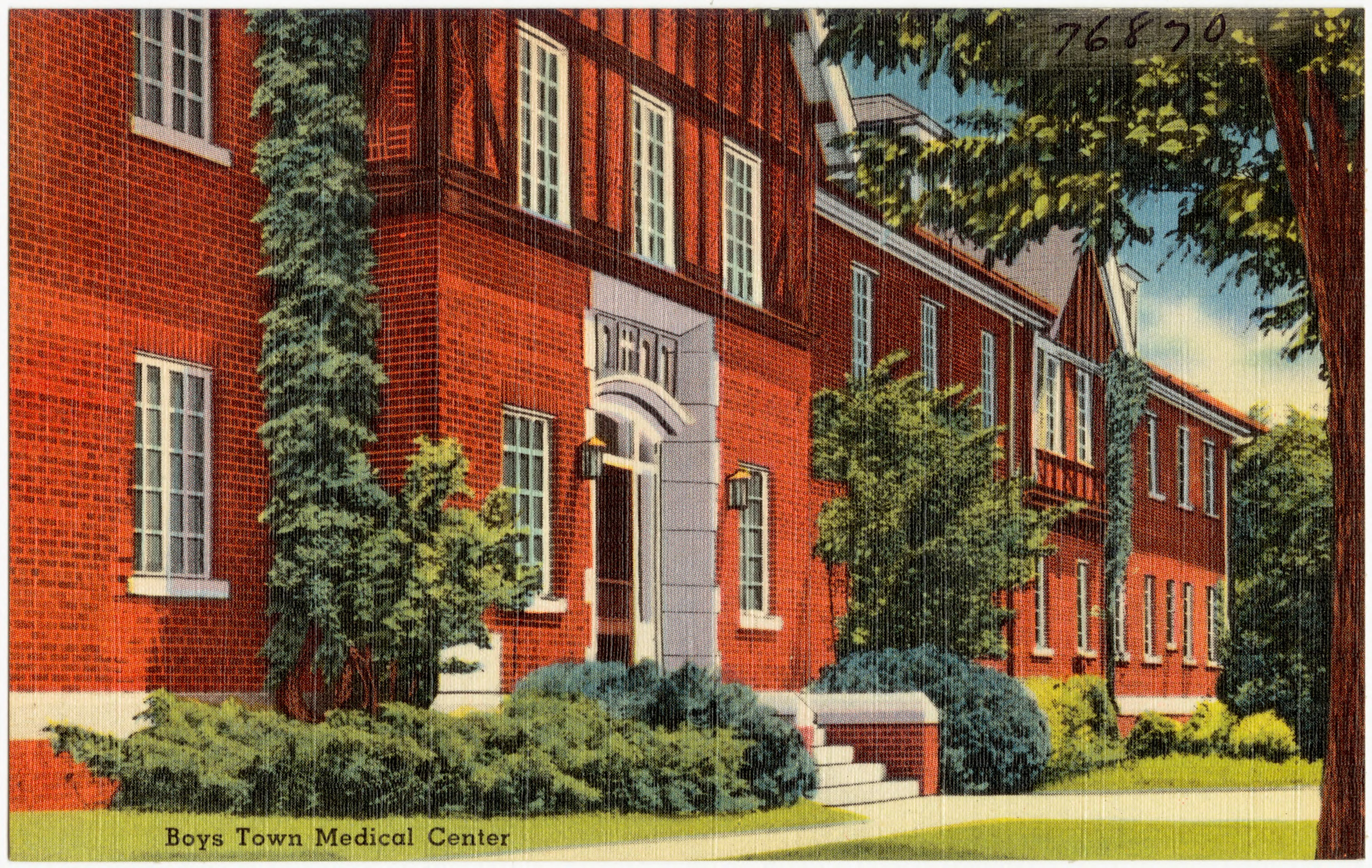
Boy's Town Medical Center (1930–1945)

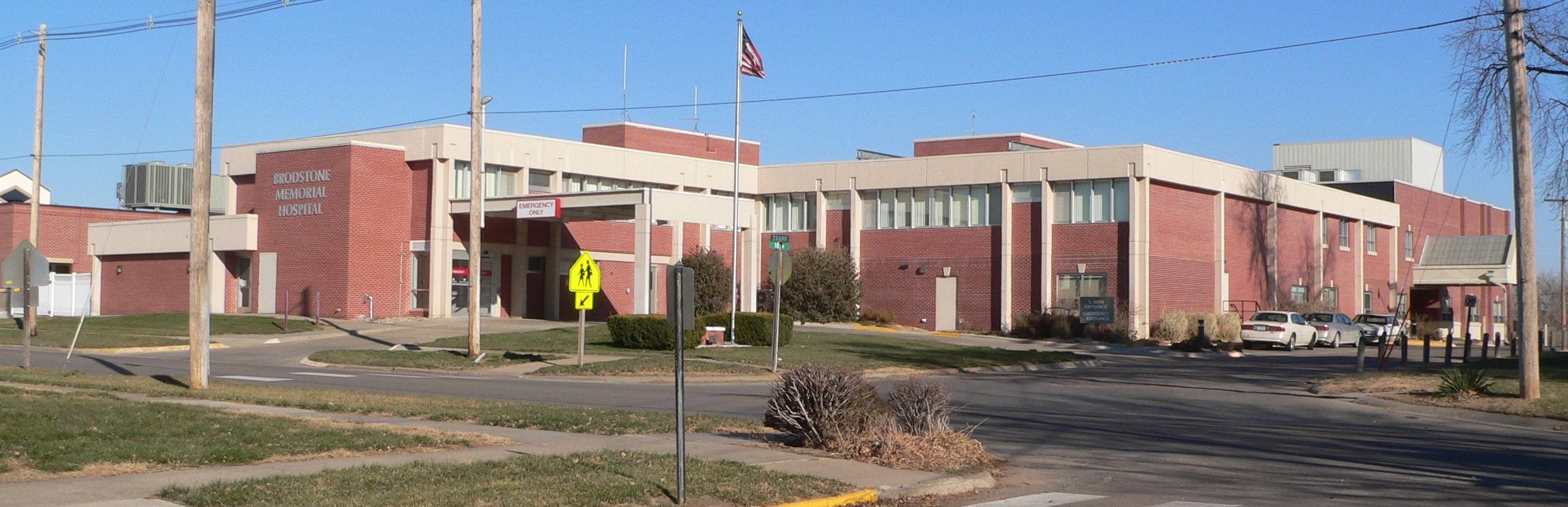
Brodstone Memorial Hospital, Superior (2010)

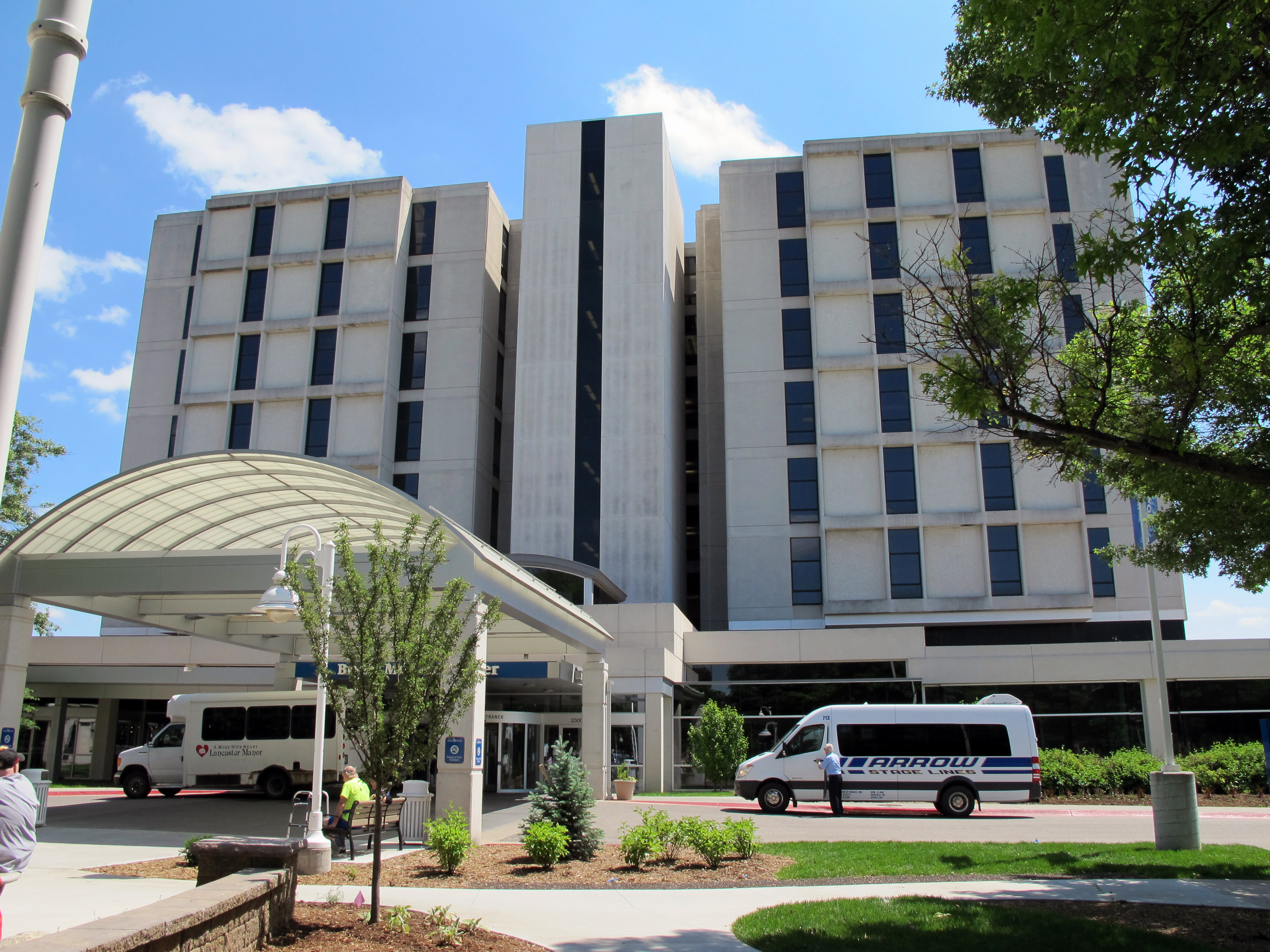
Bryan Medical Center West (2015)

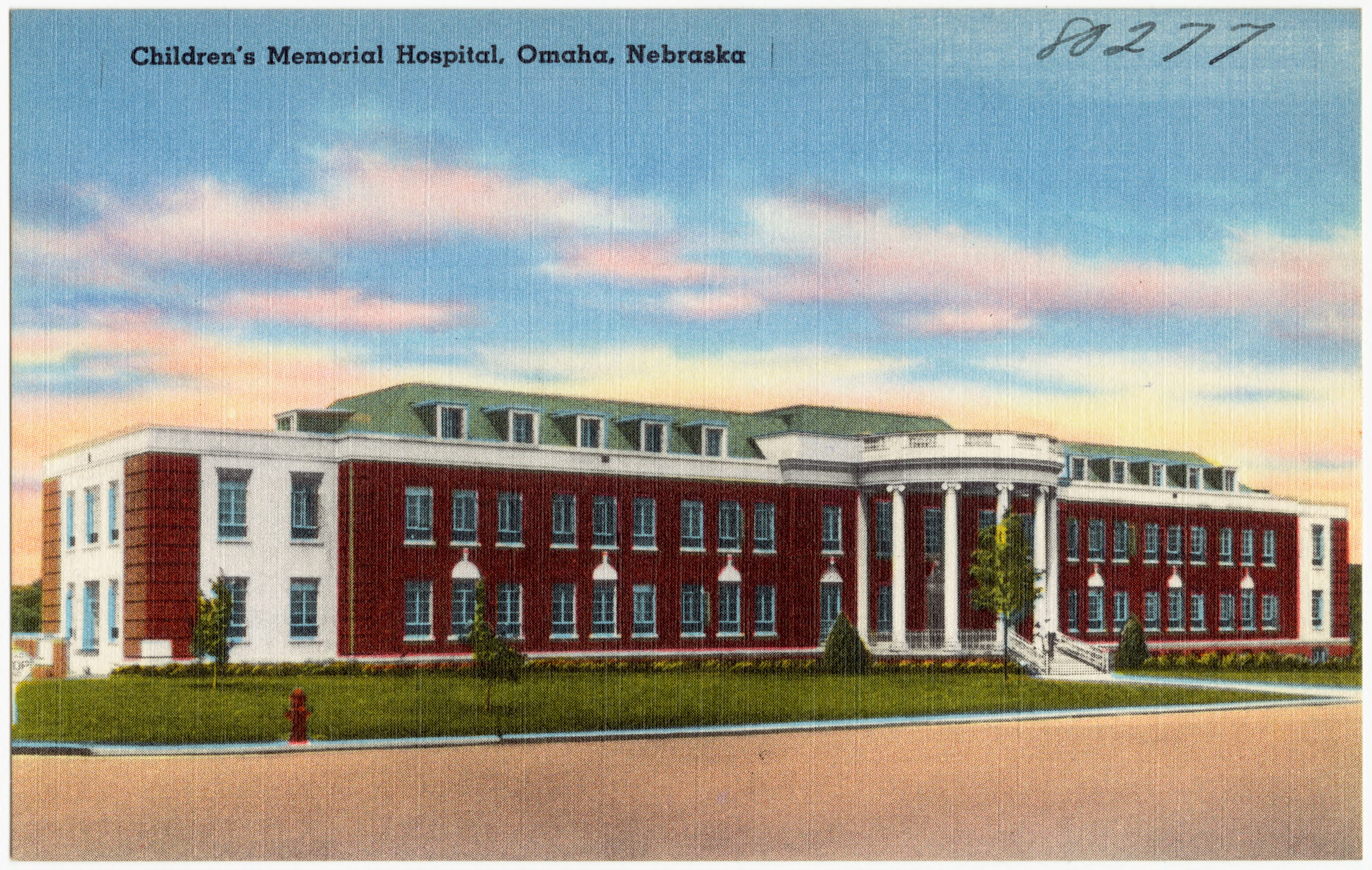
Children's Memorial Hospital, Omaha (1930–1945)

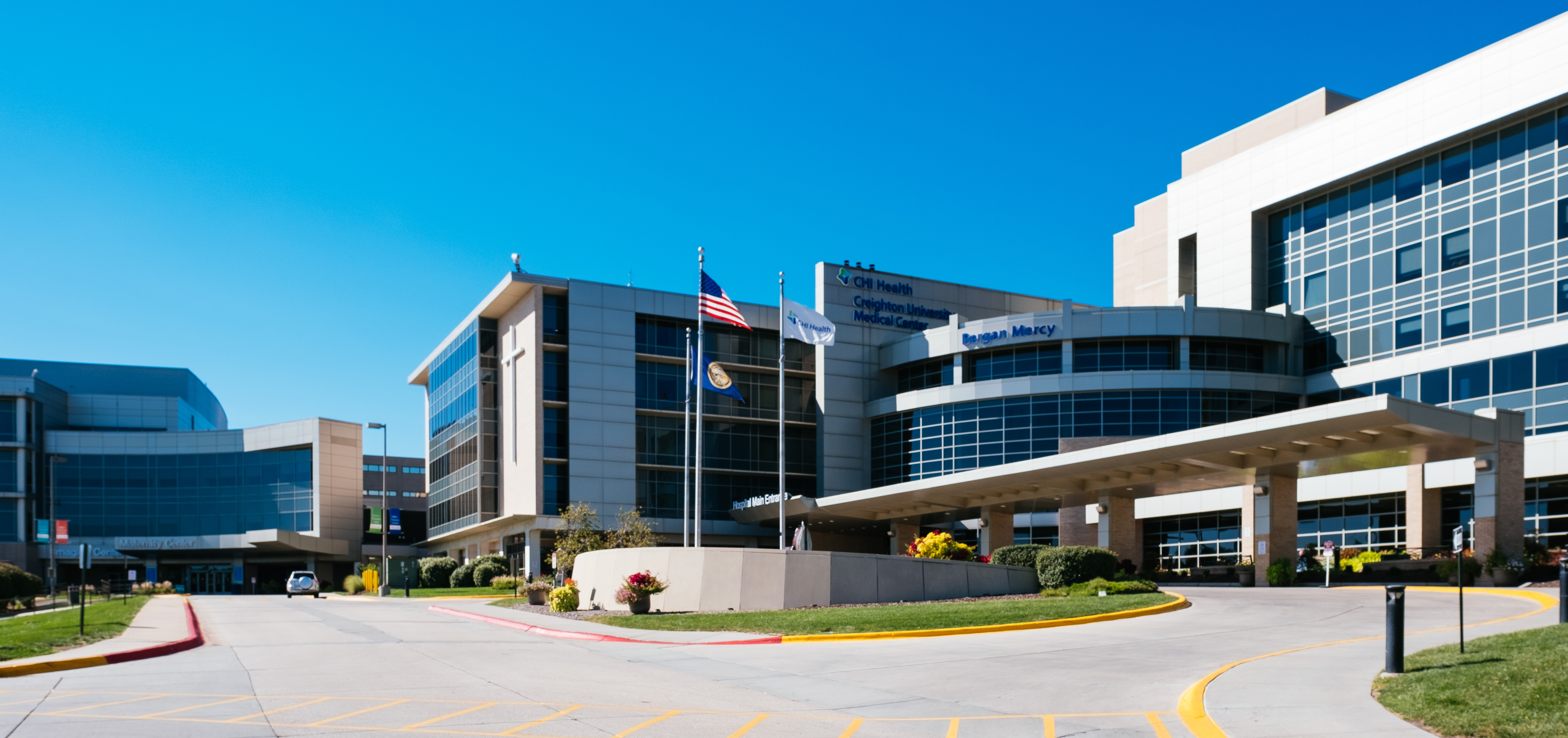
Creighton University, Bergan Mercy Hospital, Omaha (2018)

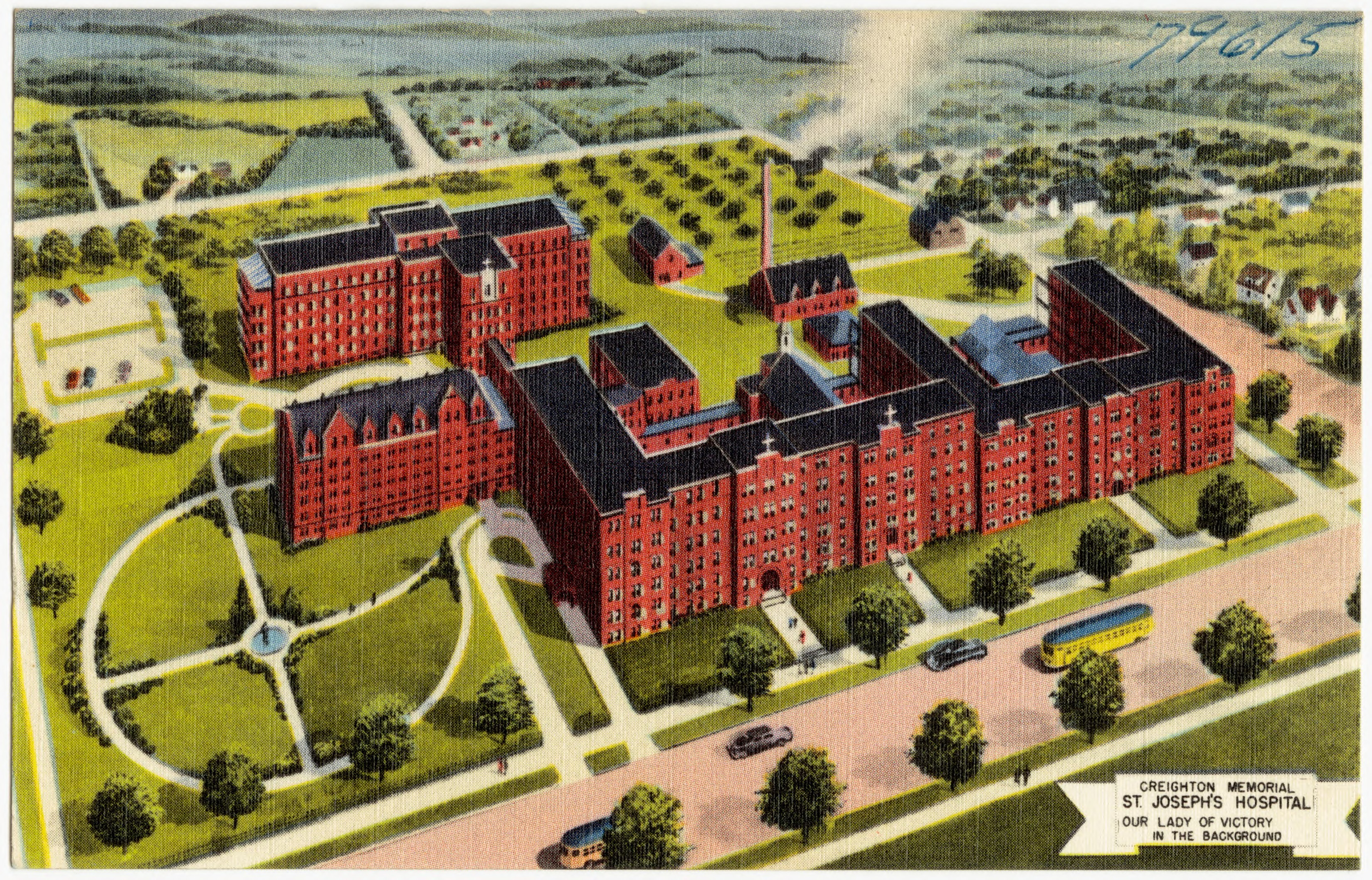
St. Joseph's Memorial Hospital, predecessor to Creighton University Hospital (1930–1945)

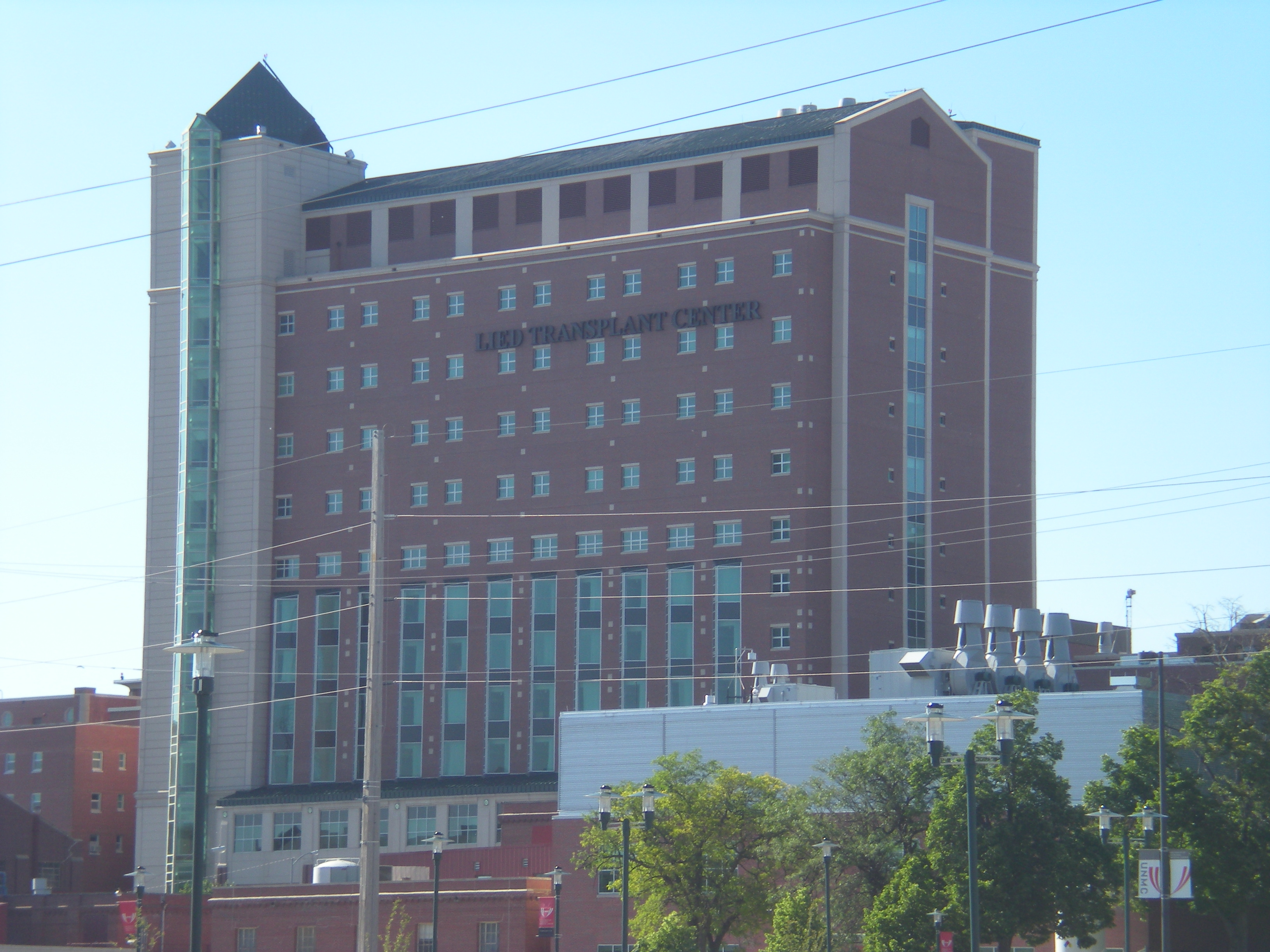
Lied Transpalant Center, UNMC, Omaha (2010)

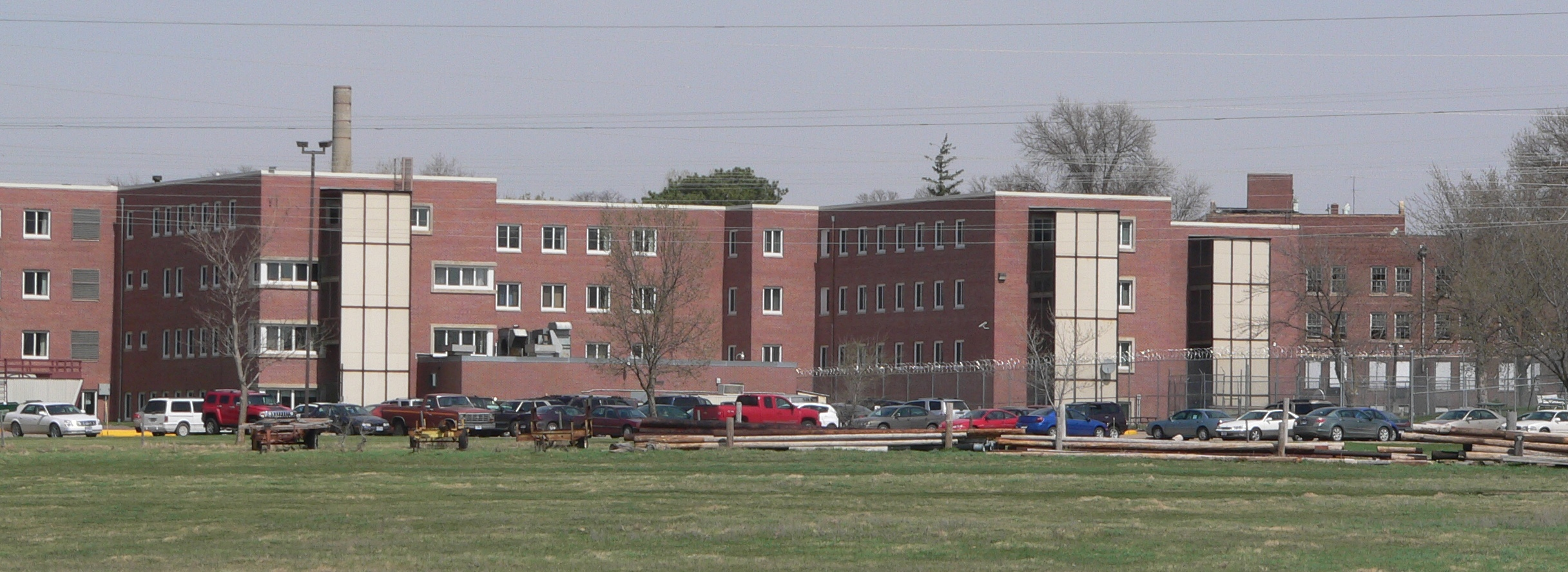
Norfolk Regional Center, Norfolk (2010)

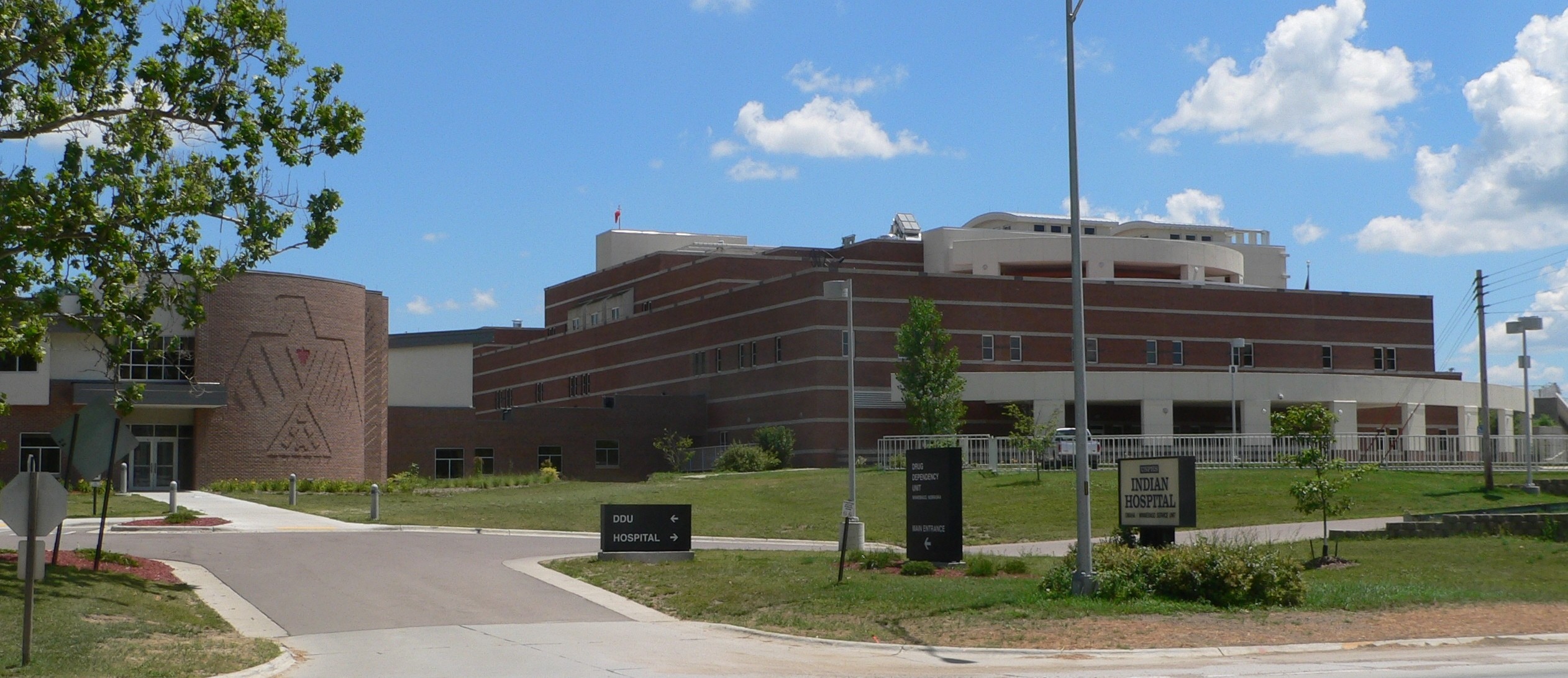
Indian Health Service Hospital, WInnebago (2010)

This is a list of notable hospitals in Nebraska (U.S. state). In 2022, there were a total of 110 active hospitals in Nebraska, with a combined number of licensed beds of over 6,944.

Breakout of hospitals in Nebraska by type
| Type | Licensed hospitals | Licensed beds |
|---|---|---|
| General acute hospital | 31 | 4662 |
| Critical access hospital | 63 | 1219 |
| Children's hospital | 3 | 308 |
| Long-term care hospital | 4 | 261 |
| Psychiatric hospital | 1 | 150 |
| Non-licensed psychiatric hospital | 3 | 277 |
| Rehabilitation hospital | 1 | 67 |
| VA | 3 | |
| Indian Health Services | 1 | |
| Total | 110 | 6,944 |

== Hospitals ==
The following list shows active hospitals by city and type of hospital. There are links to articles on the most notable hospitals. The largest hospital in the state is the University of Nebraska Medical Center has 718 staffed beds and was founded in 1917. The oldest hospital, Creighton University Medical Center was found in 1870 and has 396 beds on its main campus. The number of beds are include in this table for hospitals with 50 or more licensed beds in 2022.

Notable hospitals in Nebraska
| City | Name | Type | Hospital network, additional references |
|---|---|---|---|
| Ainsworth | Brown County Hospital | Critical access hospital | |
| Albion | Boone County Community Hospital | Critical access hospital | |
| Alliance | Box Butte General Hospital | Critical access hospital | Rural Nebraska Healthcare Network |
| Alma | Harlan County Community Hospital | Critical access hospital | |
| Atkinson | West Holt Memorial Hospital | Critical access hospital | |
| Auburn | Nemaha County Hospital | Critical access hospital | |
| Aurora | Memorial Hospital | Critical access hospital | |
| Bassett | Rock County Hospital | Critical access hospital | |
| Beatrice | Beatrice Community Hospital | Critical access hospital | |
| Bellevue | Bellevue Medical Center | General acute hospital | Nebraska Medicine (91 beds, founded in 2010) |
| Benkelman | Dundy County Hospital | Critical access hospital | |
| Blair | Memorial Community Hospital | Critical access hospital | |
| Bridgeport | Morrill County Community Hospital | Critical access hospital | Rural Nebraska Healthcare Network |
| Broken Bow | Jennie Melham Medical Center | Critical access hospital | |
| Callaway | Callaway District Hospital | Critical access hospital | |
| Cambridge | Tri Valley Health Systems | Critical access hospital | |
| Central City | Merrick Medical Center | Critical access hospital | Bryan Health |
| Chadron | Chadron Community Hospital | Critical access hospital | Rural Nebraska Healthcare Network |
| Columbus | Columbus Community Hospital | General acute hospital | (52 beds, founded in 1879) |
| Cozad | Cozard Community Hospital | Critical access hospital | |
| Creighton | Avera Creighton Hospital | Critical access hospital | |
| Crete | Crete Area Medical Center | Critical access hospital | Bryan Health |
| David City | Butler County Health Care Center | Critical access hospital | |
| Fairbury | Jefferson County Memorial Hospital | Critical access hospital | |
| Falls City | Community Medical Center | Critical access hospital | |
| Franklin | Franklin County Memorial Hospital | Critical access hospital | |
| Fremont | Methodist Fremont Health (Fremont Area Medical Center) | General acute hospital | (75 beds, founded in 1940) |
| Friend | Warren Memorial Hospital | Critical access hospital | |
| Geneva | Fillmore County Hospital | Critical access hospital | |
| Genoa | Genoa Community Hospital | Critical access hospital | |
| Gordon | Gordon Memorial Hospital | Critical access hospital | Rural Nebraska Healthcare Network |
| Gothenburg | Gothenburg Memorial Hospital | Critical access hospital | |
| Grand Island | St. Francis Hospital | General acute hospital | CHI Health (155 beds, founded in 1883) |
| Grand Island | Grand Island VA Medical Center | VA | Veterans Health Administration (founded in 1887) |
| Grand Island | Grand Island Regional Medical Center | General acute hospital | (67 beds, founded in 2020) |
| Grant | Perkins County Health Services | Critical access hospital | Rural Nebraska Healthcare Network |
| Hastings | Mary Lanning Memorial Hospital | General acute hospital | (170 beds, founded in 1915) |
| Hebron | Thayer County Hospital | Critical access hospital | |
| Holdrege | Phelps Memorial Health Center | Critical access hospital | |
| Imperial | Chase County Community Hospital | Critical access hospital | |
| Kearney | Good Samaritan Hospital | General acute hospital | CHI Health (175 beds, founded in 1924) |
| Kearney | Kearney Regional Medical Center | General acute hospital | Bryan Health (93 beds, founded in 2014) |
| Kimball | Kimball Health Services | Critical access hospital | |
| Lexington | Tri County Area Hospital | Critical access hospital | (25 beds) |
| Lincoln | Bryan Medical Center East Campus | General acute hospital | Bryan Health |
| Lincoln | Bryan Medical Center West Campus | General acute hospital | Bryan Health |
| Lincoln | St. Elizabeth Regional Medical Center | General acute hospital | CHI Health (258 beds, founded in 1889) |
| Lincoln | Nebraska Heart Hospital | General acute hospital | CHI Health (63 beds) |
| Lincoln | VA Medical Center | VA | Veterans Health Administration |
| Lynch | Niobrara Valley Hospital | Critical access hospital | |
| McCook | Community Hospital | Critical access hospital | |
| Minden | Kearney County Community Hospital | Critical access hospital | |
| Nebraska City | St. Mary's Hospital | Critical access hospital | CHI Health |
| Neligh | Antelope Memorial Hospital | Critical access hospital | |
| Norfolk | Faith Regional Medical Center | General acute hospital | (131 beds) |
| Norfolk | Norfolk Regional Center | Licensed psychiatric hospital | Nebraska Department of Health & Human Services (150 beds, founded in 1888) |
| North Platte | Great Plains Regional Medical Center | General acute hospital | (116 beds, founded in 1975) |
| Ogallala | Ogallala Community Hospital | Critical access hospital | |
| Omaha | Boys Town National Research Hospital | Children's hospital | Boys Town (52 beds, founded in 1977) |
| Omaha | Creighton University Medical Center - Bergan Mercy | General acute hospital | CHI Health (396 beds, founded in 1870) |
| Omaha | Creighton University Medical Center- University Campus (Little Creighton) | General acute hospital | CHI Health (153 beds) |
| Omaha | Immanuel Medical Center | General acute hospital | CHI Health (352 beds, founded in 1910) |
| Omaha | Lakeside Medical Center | General acute hospital | CHI Health (153 beds, founded in 2004) |
| Omaha | Children's Hospital & Medical Center | Children's hospital | (225 beds, founded in 1949) |
| Omaha | Madonna Rehabilitation Hospital | Rehabilitation hospital | Madonna Rehabilition Hospitals (67 beds, founded in 1958) |
| Omaha | Methodist Hospital - Main Campus | General acute hospital | Nebraska Methodist Health System (423 beds, founded in 1891) |
| Omaha | Methodist Women's Hospital | General acute hospital | Nebraska Methodist Health System (137 beds, founded in 2010) |
| Omaha | Nebraska Orthopaedic Hospital | General acute hospital | (24 beds, founded in 2004) |
| Omaha | University of Nebraska Medical Center | General acute hospital | Nebraska Medicine (718 beds, founded in 1917) |
| Omaha | VA Medical Center | VA | Veterans Health Administration |
| O'Neill | St. Anthony's Hospital | Critical access hospital | |
| Ord | Valley County Hospital | Critical access hospital | |
| Osceola | Annie Jeffrey Health Center | Critical access hospital | |
| Oshkosh | Garden County Hospital | Critical access hospital | |
| Osmond | Osmond General Hospital | Critical access hospital | |
| Papillion | Midlands Community Hospital | General acute hospital | CHI Health (58 beds, founded in 1976) |
| Pawnee City | Pawnee County Memorial Hospital | Critical access hospital | |
| Pender | Pender Community Hospital | Critical access hospital | |
| Plainview | Plainview Public Hospital | Critical access hospital | CHI Health (15 beds) |
| Red Cloud | Webster County Community Hospital | Critical access hospital | |
| Saint Paul | Howard County Community Hospital and Medical Center | Critical access hospital | |
| Schuyler | Schuyler Memorial Hospital | Critical access hospital | CHI Health (25 beds) |
| Scottsbluff | Regional West Medical Center | General acute hospital | Rural Nebraska Healthcare Network (172 beds, founded in 1924) |
| Seward | Memorial Hospital | Critical access hospital | |
| Sidney | Sidney Regional Medical Center | Critical access hospital | Rural Nebraska Healthcare Network (25 beds) |
| Superior | Brodstone Memorial Hospital | Critical access hospital | (25 beds, founded in 1928) |
| Syracuse | Community Memorial Hospital | Critical access hospital | |
| Tecumseh | Johnson County Hospital | Critical access hospital | |
| Valentine | Cherry County Hospital | Critical access hospital | |
| Wahoo | Saunders County Community Hospital | Critical access hospital | |
| Wayne | Providence Medical Center | Critical access hospital | |
| West Point | Saint Francis Memorial Hospital | Critical access hospital | |
| Winnebago | Winnebago Indian Health Services | IHS | Indian Health Service |
| York | York General Hospital | Critical access hospital | |

== Healthcare systems in Nebraska ==
- Bryan Health
- CHI Health
- Indian Health Service
- MercyOne
- Nebraska Methodist Health System
- Rural Nebraska Healthcare Network
- Veterans Health Administration
