= Norfolk Regional Center =

- Nebraska Department of Health and Human Services
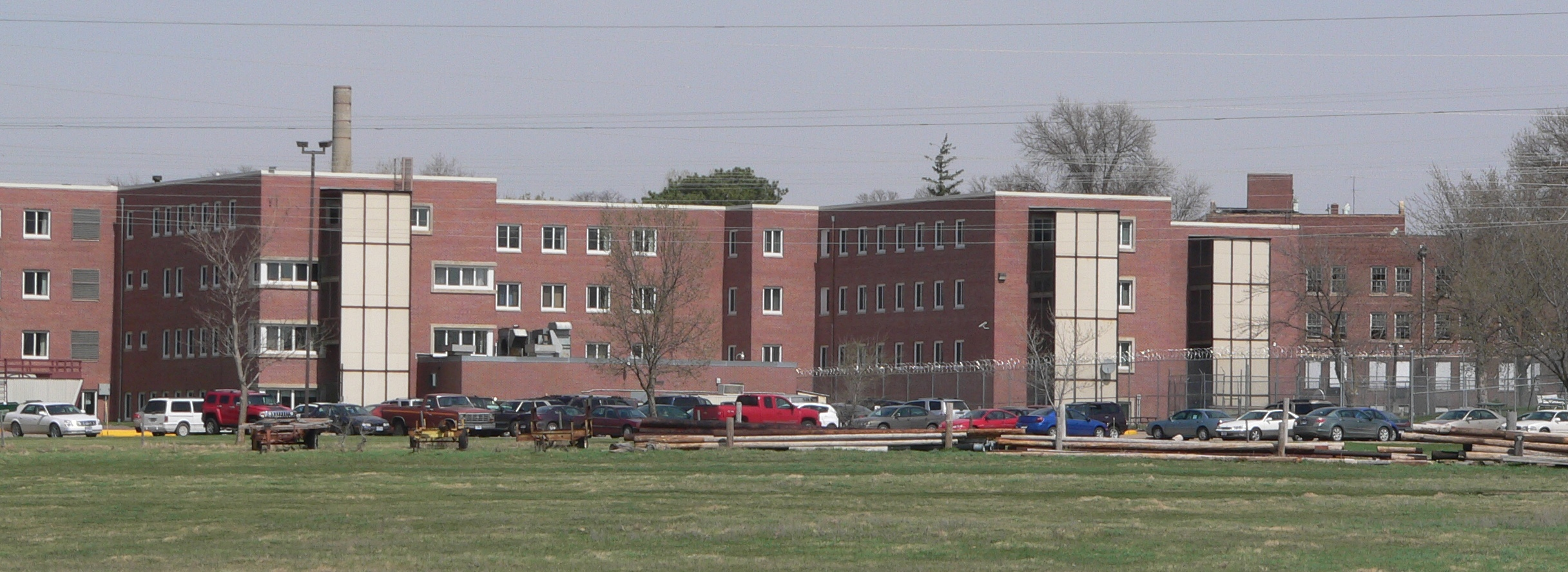
- Norfolk Regional Center, seen from the south

Geography
- Location: Norfolk, Nebraska, United States
- Coordinates: 42°03′03″N 97°23′04″W

Organization
- Type: Specialist

Services
- Beds: 120
- Speciality: Psychiatric hospital

History
- Founded: 1888

Links
- Lists: Hospitals in Nebraska

The Norfolk Regional Center is a psychiatric hospital located in Norfolk, Nebraska. It is one of three regional centers operated by the Nebraska Department of Health and Human Services.

The Norfolk center commenced operations in 1888 as the State Hospital for the Insane. At its peak, it housed over 1300 patients. As of 2010, it functioned as a 120-bed facility for the initial treatment of sex offenders.

== History ==
In 1870, the Nebraska Legislature created the Nebraska Asylum for the Insane in the capital city of Lincoln. The state's increasing population led to overcrowding at the Lincoln hospital; in 1885, the Legislature appropriated $75,000 to build a second facility in the Norfolk area, subject to the city's donating 320 acres (130 ha) of good land. The first building was completed in 1886, and the hospital opened in 1888 with 97 patients, as the State Hospital for the Insane.

For many years, the hospital was a self-sufficient community, with a complete farm operation. Inmates were responsible for most of the work on the farm and in the dairy, in addition to doing custodial work in the buildings.

Although there were cases of genuine serious mental illness among the patients, many would not be considered mentally ill or in need of institutionalization today. In the 19th century, patients were admitted for such reasons as "domestic trouble, disappointment in love, financial trouble, hepatic dullness, heredity, masterbation [sic], intemperance, overwork, overstudy, religious excitement, sun stroke, and others." One young girl had been admitted to the asylum because of homesickness.

By 1898, expansions of the facility had brought its capacity up to 300 patients. In 1901, a fire destroyed all but one building. Only one patient died, when he ran back into a burning building; the progress of the fire was slow enough to allow much of the furniture and personal property to be saved. The patients were moved to the mental institutions in Lincoln and in Hastings; the latter had been opened in 1889.

In 1905, the facility was re-opened, with three ward cottages and an administration building. More buildings were constructed as the patient population increased. At its peak, the facility housed more than 1300 patients. There was a prize-winning dairy herd, and patients and staff butchered their own meat, preserved vegetables, and produced their own clothing and power.

The facility's name was changed to the Norfolk State Hospital in 1920. Up to this time, patient care had been almost entirely custodial; in the 1920s, the first attempts at treatment of mental illness were made. These included recreational and occupational therapy—the hospital had a chorus and orchestra, and held plays and dances—but also electroconvulsive therapy, and later insulin shock therapy, hydrotherapy, and fever therapy.

=== Deinstitutionalization and new focus ===
The development of psychiatric drugs beginning in the early 1950s offered the prospect of rehabilitating many patients. As progress was made in the treatment of mental illness, the hospital's population declined.

In 1962, the name of the facility was changed to "Norfolk Regional Center". In the following year, the Nebraska Soldiers' and Sailors' Home, later renamed the Norfolk Veterans' Home, was established on the center's campus. It remained there until 2001, when it was moved to a new site elsewhere in Norfolk.

Following the passage of mental-health-care legislation in 2004, increasing numbers of patients were moved from the state regional centers to community-based treatment programs. A 2005 study commissioned by the Nebraska Legislature urged the conversion of the center to a treatment center for prison inmates who used methamphetamine. However, by 2006, there were only 100 beds remaining at the center, and its future was in doubt.

In that same year, however, the Legislature passed a measure broadening the definition of a sex offender, and adding new requirements for post-prison treatment. The Regional Center was converted to a center for such treatment. In mid-2006, it discharged its final mental-health patient and devoted itself exclusively to sex offenders.

== Current status ==
As of 2010, the Norfolk Regional Center was a 120-bed facility providing Phase I services in the Nebraska Sex Offender Treatment Program. In the three-phase program, Phase I "orients patients to the treatment process; begins working with patients to accept full responsibility for their sex offending and sexually deviant behaviors; teaches patients to give and receive feedback and utilize coping skills; and builds motivation for the intensive treatment in Phases II and III which are provided at Lincoln Regional Center."

Patients included about 50 level-three offenders, who are considered at high risk of re-offending. All patients were confined to the facility, which has high-security correctional fences and locking doors with badge readers and security codes. Patients were also monitored constantly, both to ensure compliance with treatment and to prevent escapes. The center's recent recidivism rate was 13.7%.

With the decrease in the patient load, many of the facility's buildings were no longer needed. As of 2010, some of these had been demolished, while others were to be torn down when funds became available. Still other buildings were used by Northeast Community College, which is adjacent to the Regional Center.
