= Bryan College of Health Sciences =

Undergraduate college in Lincoln, Nebraska, US

- Former names: Bryan Memorial School of Nursing; BryanLGH College of Health Sciences
- Type: Undergraduate medical school
- Established: 1926
- Location: 1535 S 52nd St., Lincoln, Nebraska, U.S. 40.79695265854694°N 96.65056570987848°W
- Campus: Urban
- Mascot: Blue Healer
- Website: www.bryanhealthcollege.edu/bcohs/

Bryan College of Health Sciences is an undergraduate medical school in Lincoln, Nebraska, United States. The college was established in 1926 and opened in 1929 as the Bryan Memorial School of Nursing and re-branded to its current name in 2012. The college is an affiliate of Bryan Health, with its main campus located on the provider's East Campus. The college also has a campus in Hastings.

== History ==
The college was established in 1926 and began operations in 1929 as the Bryan Memorial School of Nursing. The school was founded as an affiliate of Bryan Health, intended to train nurses for the hospital.

In May 1960, it was announced that the college would be moving to a new building. In December 1960, the college announced that it would become a co-educational nursing school, and officially began accepting men in 1961. The new School of Nursing building opened in 1961.

In 2002, the college began expansions and renovations to the nursing facility. That same year, the college transitioned from a three-year nursing school to a four-year school that offers a Bachelor in Science degree Following the changes, the school re-branded to the Bryan-LGH College of Health Sciences.

The hospital changed its name again in 2012 to Bryan College of Health Sciences to reflect the re-branding of its affiliate, Bryan Health. Additionally, the college introduced a new logo and mascot. The college also expanded its courses, which included adding MSN nurse educator, biomedical sciences, public health, Spanish, gerontology, health care management and humanities and social sciences.

In the 2020s, the college began a series of partnerships with different colleges. The college partnered with Hastings College in 2020 to address the shortage of healthcare workers in Nebraska. Des Moines University partnered with Bryan in 2025 to help students from Bryan continue their education there.

== Academics ==
Undergraduate demographics as of 2025
Race and ethnicity	Total
White	84%
Hispanic	8%
Asian	2%
Two or more races	3%
Black	2%
Unknown	2%

The Bryan College of Health Sciences major Fields of Study are registered nursing, Allied Health Diagnostic, Biology, Health Professions and Related Clinical Sciences, and Health and Medical Administrative Services. The college awards diplomas up to the doctoral level. The college is an affiliate of Bryan Health and is located on the hospital's East Campus.

== Campuses ==
Bryan College of Health Sciences has two campuses. Its main campus is located in Lincoln, Nebraska at Bryan Health's East Campus. The college also has an additional campus in Hastings, which opened in 2021.
