= Hastings College =

Presbyterian college in Nebraska, US

Coordinates: 40°35′30″N 98°22′23″W

- Motto: Pro Rege (Latin)
- Motto in English: For the King
- Type: Private college
- Established: 1882
- Religious affiliation: Presbyterian Church
- Academic affiliations: Space-grant
- Endowment: $101,000,000
- President: Rich Lloyd
- Undergraduates: 1,015 (fall 2018)
- Location: Hastings, Nebraska, U.S.
- Campus: 120 acres (49 ha)
- Colors: White & Crimson
- Nickname: Broncos
- Sporting affiliations: NAIA – GPAC
- Website: www.hastings.edu

Hastings College is a private college in Hastings, Nebraska, United States. It was founded in 1882 and is a Presbyterian affiliated college. The campus includes 40 buildings, 12 of which are listed on the National Register of Historic Places. The college's mascot is the Broncos.

== History ==
Hastings College was originally proposed in 1873, two years after the city of Hastings was established. Later in 1880, the local Presbyterian church announced plans to create it. The college was officially formed in 1882 and began its first academic year on September 13. The college's first building was the McCormick Hall, which was built in 1873 and was renovated for college purposes in 1884. In 1909, it was announced that the college would attempt to merge with a college in Bellevue. However, the plan ultimately failed after both colleges denied interest in merging.

In the 1920s, the college underwent major expansions. These included the addition of a gymnasium, the Taylor Dining Hall, and a temporary chapel. In 1934, it was announced that Bellevue College would again be merged with Hastings College. The merger was completed that same year. In the early 1960s, the college opened the Bellevue House, the Perkins Library, and a new administration building. By 1976, enrollment dropped from 850 to 700 and the college began plans to increase funding by its centennial year. Additionally, it began planning with other private colleges to get funding from the Nebraska State Legislature.

The college reached its funding goals by its centennial year and went up in enrollment to 920 students. The Garold C.J. and Marie Gray Center for the Communication Arts was dedicated on September 6, 1988, by president Ronald Reagan and first-lady Nancy Reagan. In 2020, Bryan College of Health Sciences and Hastings College announced a partnership to address the shortage of healthcare workers in Nebraska.

== Academics ==
Undergraduate demographics as of 2025
Race and ethnicity	Total
White	64%
Hispanic	12%
Black	6%
Asian	5%
Native American	1%
Two or more races	2%
International student	6%
Unknown	7%
Economic diversity
Low-income (Note: The percentage of students who received an income-based federal Pell grant intended for low-income students.)	29%
Affluent (Note: The percentage of students who are a part of the American middle class at the bare minimum.)	71%

Hastings College offers more than 40 undergraduate majors and pre-professional programs and one graduate degree, a Master of Arts in Teaching. Major fields of study include Business Administration, Multi/Interdisciplinary Studies, Teacher Education and Professional Development, Special Education and Teaching, and Psychology. the college has been accredited by the Higher Learning Commission's North Central Association of Colleges and Schools since 1916. It has been accredited by the National Council for the Accreditation of Teacher Education since 1964.

== Campus ==
The Hastings College campus consists of 40 buildings on 120 acres (49 ha). The college's first building was McCormick Hall, constructed in 1883 and still in use today. McCormik Hall was added to the National Register of Historic Places in 1975. In 2017, the Hastings College Historic District was created, which added eleven new buildings onto the register, and included McCormick Hall.

== Athletics ==
The Hastings 24 athletic intercollegiate varsity teams are called the Broncos. The college is a member of the National Association of Intercollegiate Athletics (NAIA), primarily competing in the Great Plains Athletic Conference (GPAC) since the 1969–70 academic year.

== Notable alumni and faculty ==
- Clayton Anderson, astronaut
- Bill Barrett, politician
- Milan D. Bish, United States Ambassador
- Marc Boerigter, football player
- Edward Bushnell, track and field athlete who competed at the 1900 Summer Olympics
- Yoo Chang-soon, Prime Minister of South Korea in 1982
- Carrie Eighmey, basketball coach
- Lisa Graves, writer
- Mary W. Gray, mathematician and author
- Michael Hancock, mayor of Denver, Colorado
- Tony Hobson, coach
- Jeanine E. Jackson, diplomat
- John Kuehn, politician
- Ernesto Lacayo, football player
- Tom Osborne, football coach and politician
- Bill Parcells, football coach
- Ivy Ruckman, author
- Akeem Ward, soccer player
- Matt Rahn, football player and coach
- Don Welch, poet
