= Kimball Health Services =

General hospital in Kimball, Nebraska, U.S.

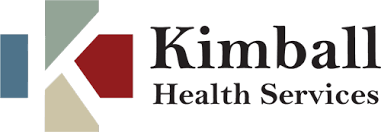

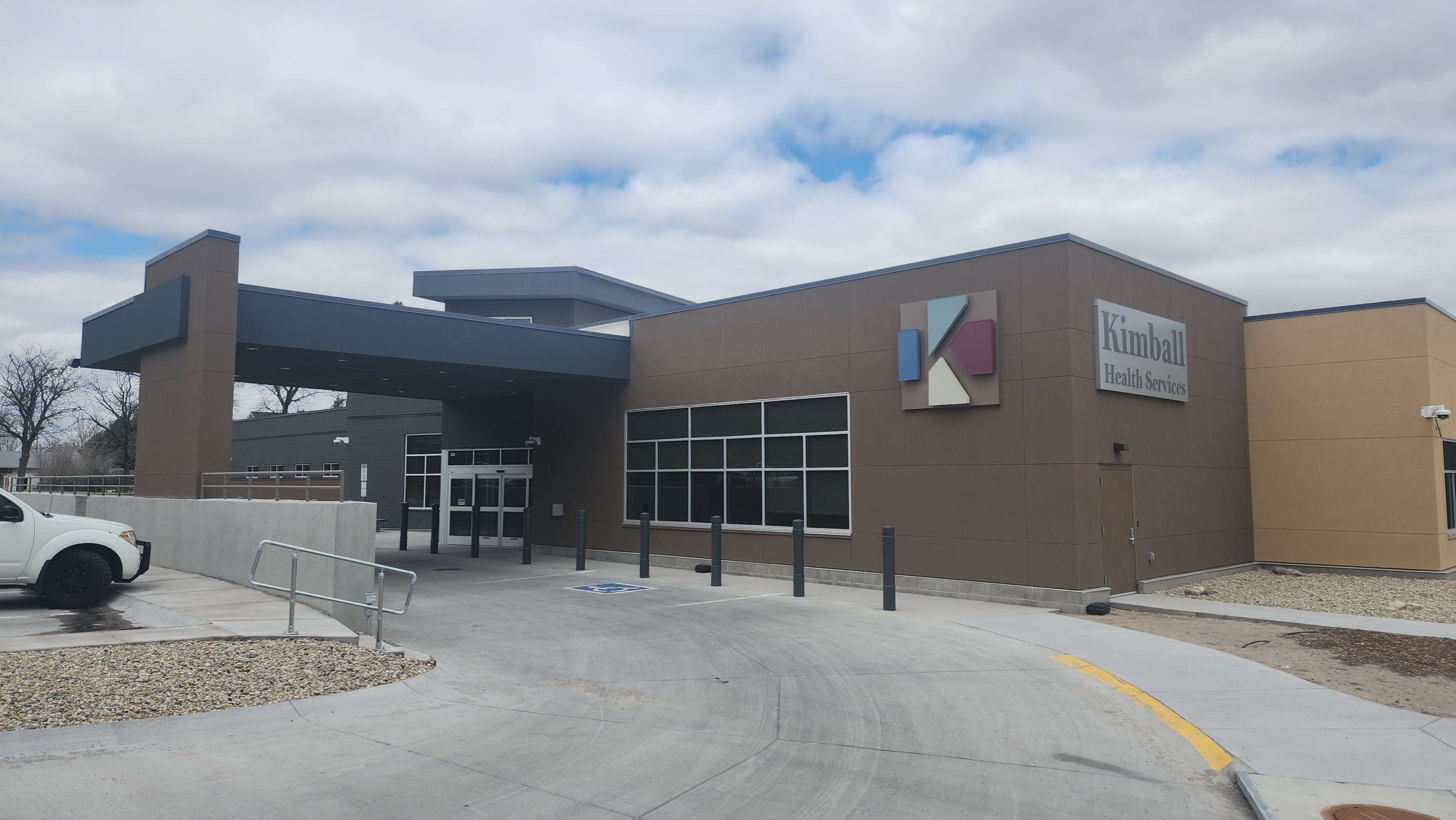

Geography
- Location: 255 W 4th Street, Kimball, Nebraska, U.S.
- Coordinates: 41.23505576227269°N 103.6651629014995°W

Organisation
- Care system: Public
- Type: General hospital

Services
- Emergency department: Level IV Trauma Center
- Beds: 14
- Helipad: Yes

History
- Former name: Kimball County Hospital
- Opened: August 21, 1950; February 19, 2024

Links
- Website: kimballhealth.org

Kimball Health Services (KHS) is a general hospital located in Kimball, Nebraska, United States. It is the only hospital located in Kimball County, Nebraska. Kimball Health Services is a Level IV Trauma Center and includes 14 beds. The hospital was founded as the Kimball County Hospital upon opening in August 1950. In February 2024, the new hospital building was opened.

== History ==
In 1944, a bond issue of $90,000 was passed in order to build a hospital for Kimball County. The original Kimball County Hospital opened on August 21, 1950. The original hospital had 25 beds, including 22 for adults, and three for children.

In February 2000, it was announced that the building would be renovated and would have several additions added. The bond issue was passed by voters and construction began in September of that year. Updates to the hospital were completed in 2002. In 2003, Kimball Health Services became the first hospital in the state to be designated as a Level IV Trauma Center.

In 2013, Kimball Health Services purchased the decommissioned Kimball West Elementary School and partially renovated it for use as an additional clinic. In 2014, Kimball Health Services upgraded its electronic record system.

In March 2021, it was announced that a new hospital would be built to replace the former facility. Ground for the $46 million hospital was broken in April 2022. The building was built on the former site of Kimball West Elementary School. During construction, a time capsule buried by students of the former elementary school in 2000 was dug up early and was intended to be opened in 2025. The new Kimball Health Services hospital opened on February 19, 2024.
