= Regional West Medical Center =

Regional hospital located in Scottsbluff, Nebraska, U.S.

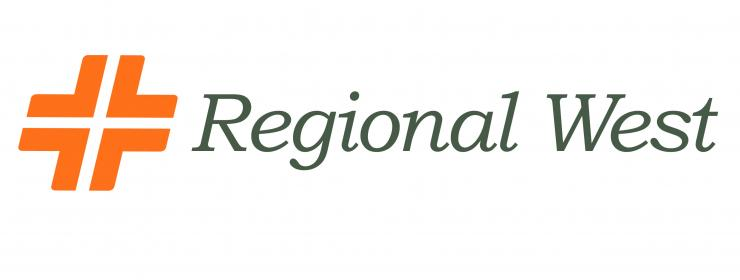

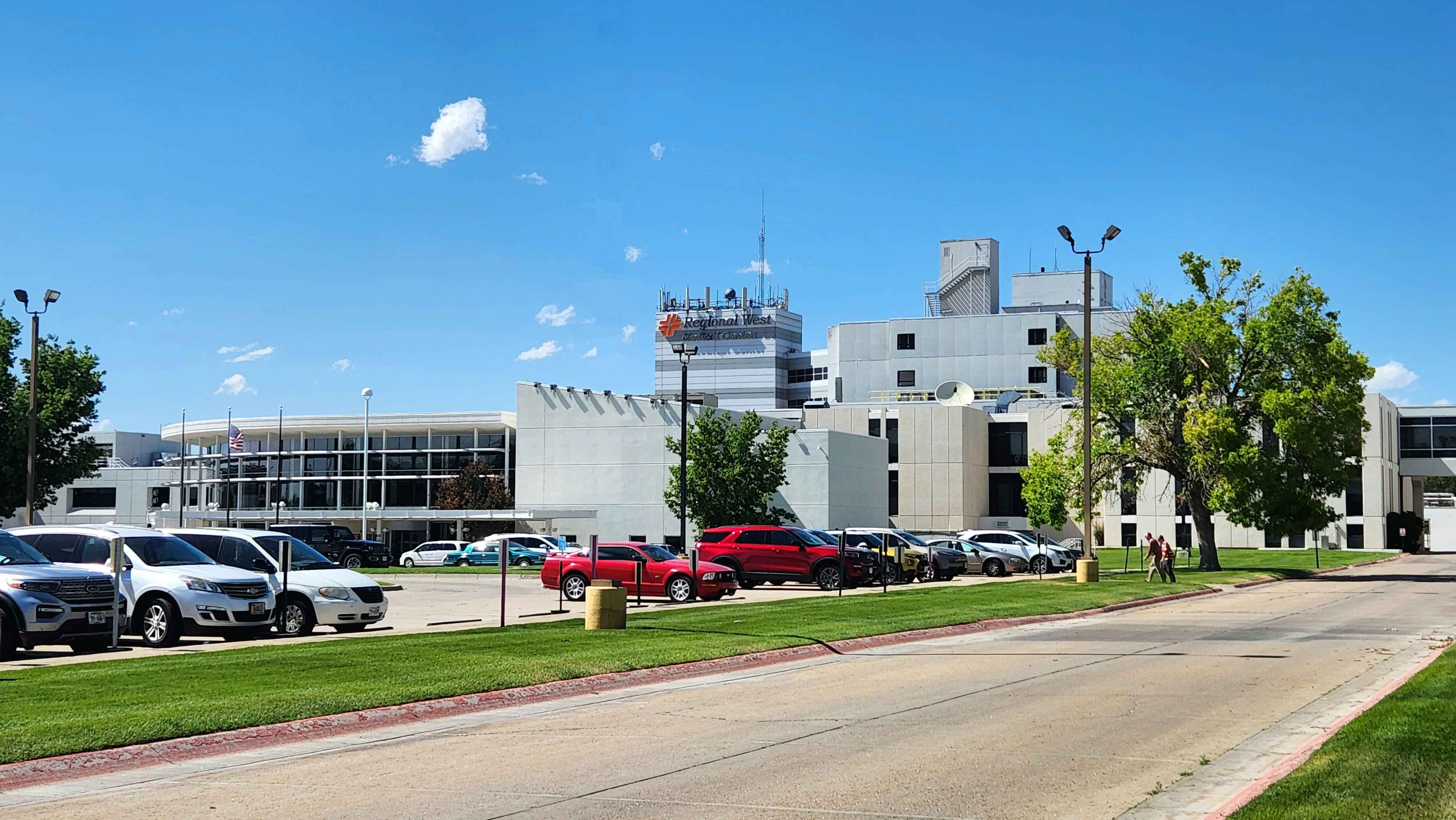

Geography
- Location: 4021 Ave. B, Scottsbluff, Nebraska, U.S.
- Coordinates: 41°53′12.930″N 103°39′53.222″W

Organisation
- Type: District

Services
- Emergency department: Level II trauma center
- Beds: 188

Helipads
- Helipad: Yes

History
- Former names: West Nebraska Methodist Hospital; West Nebraska General Hospital
- Opened: 1924

Links
- Website: rwhs.org

Regional West Medical Center, commonly referred to as Regional West, is a regional hospital located in Scottsbluff, Nebraska, United States. The hospital was founded in 1924 as West Nebraska Methodist Hospital. The hospital changed its name to West Nebraska General Hospital in 1954. In 1967, a new hospital opened due to the growing size of western Nebraska. In 1985, a three-level addition, called Med Center 2000 opened. The hospital changed its name to Regional West Medical Center in 1988 claiming it to "better fit their role as a regional hospital."

In 1995, Regional West introduced its air ambulance service, AirLink. In the 2000s, Regional West founded Regional West Physicians Clinics. In the 2010s, Regional West created affiliations with Garden County Health Services and the University of Colorado. In 2020, the critical care unit was expanded. In 2024, Regional West celebrated its 100th anniversary.

== History ==
=== West Nebraska Methodist Hospital ===
Regional West Medical Center was founded in 1924 under the name West Nebraska Methodist Hospital. Plans for a hospital were announced in 1922 after the large growth of Western Nebraska. The hospital was dedicated on April 13, 1924. By 1928, the hospital was fully approved by the American College of Surgeons.

=== West Nebraska General Hospital ===
In 1954, West Nebraska Methodist Hospital changed its name to West Nebraska General Hospital. In 1959, due to the growing population of Western Nebraska, the board voted to build a new facility. In 1967, the $4 million 112 bed facility was completed and had its open house on May 6 of that year.

In 1983, Med Center 2000 was announced by West Nebraska Regional Hospital. The addition was expected to be a three level addition and would start construction in a month after the announcement. The addition was expected to be finished by late 1985 to early 1986. The project broke ground on October 30, 1983 and Med Center 2000 officially opened on September 29, 1985.

=== Regional West Medical Center ===
In 1988, West Nebraska General Hospital changed its name to Regional West Medical Center. Regional West changed their name, claiming to "better fit their role as a regional hospital." The following year, Medical Plaza North opened, a plaza for independent medical operators to lease out space in.

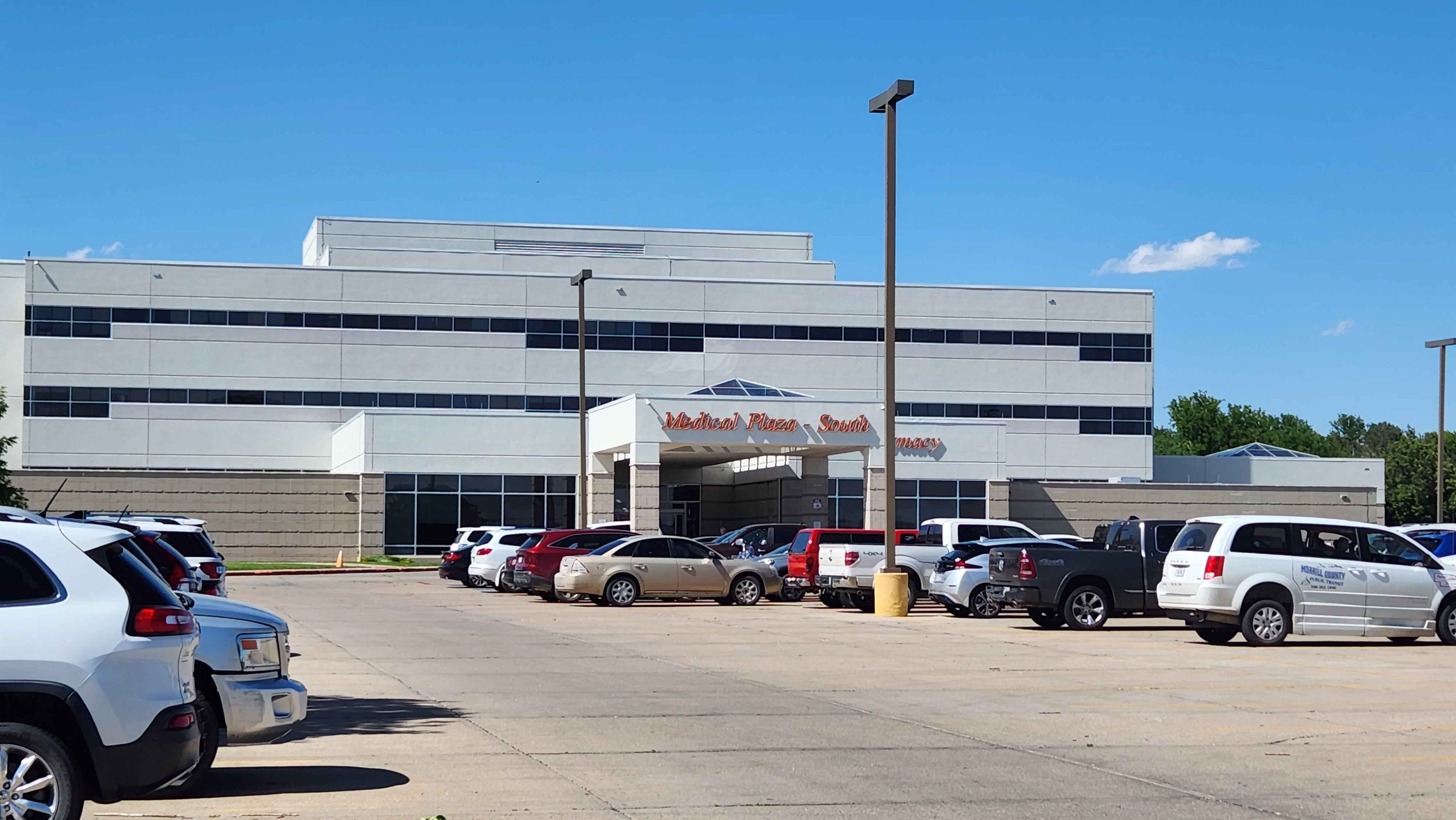
Front of Medical Plaza South

In 1989, Regional West announced The Village at Regional West apartment complex. The complex broke ground on December 15, 1989 with construction expected to be finished on January 15, 1991. The Village at Regional West was intended to be used as a place independent and assisted living, specifically as a retirement community. The complex partially opened in December 1990 with the completion of the west wing. The Village at Regional West had its grand opening on June 30, 1991.

In 1995, Regional West Medical Center introduced AirLink, an air ambulance that would allow for the easier transportation of patients between hospitals. The following year, the AirLink helicopter was damaged by a Colorado hailstorm and was out of service for the time being.

In the 2000s, Regional West expanded into clinics with Regional West Physicians Clinics. Regional West founded the company to help manage the affiliated clinics. Dr. David Holdt joined Regional West Physicians Clinics as president and CEO in 2008.

In 2014, Garden County Health Services, a hospital located in Oshkosh, Nebraska, affiliated with Regional West. In 2017, Regional West purchased a Philips Brilliance Big Bore CT Simulator. The following year, Regional West increased its relationship with the University of Colorado.

In 2020, the hospital expanded its critical care unit.

== Services ==
Regional West Medical Center is a Level II trauma center. Regional West has services in neurology, neurosurgery, cancer, radiology, family medicine, cardiology, pulmonology, critical care, acute rehabilitation, pain management, and other fields of rehabilitation.
