= Bryan Health =

American healthcare network

- Formerly: BryanLGH Health System
- Company type: Private
- Industry: Health care
- Genre: Health Care System
- Founded: 1997; 29 years ago
- Headquarters: Lincoln, Nebraska, U.S.
- Services: Hospital
- Number of employees: 3,500
- Website: www.bryanhealth.com

Bryan Health (formerly BryanLGH Health System) is an American not-for-profit healthcare organization located in Lincoln, Nebraska. The system operates an acute-care hospital, several outpatient clinics as well as a physician network and a heart institute. The system is affiliated with the Bryan College of Health Sciences. The system was established in 1997 from the merger of Bryan Memorial Hospital and Lincoln General Hospital.

== History ==
The organization was formed in 1997 by the merger of two pre-existing hospitals in Lincoln: Bryan Memorial Hospital and Lincoln General Hospital. The name BryanLGH was chosen to reflect the names of the pre-existing hospitals, both of which had been in operation since 1926. Bryan's physician network and heart institute have been added since the merger. The organization's name is derived from William Jennings Bryan's gift of land to the United Methodist Church for the East Campus hospital in 1922.

In 2003, the hospital system opened Crete Area Medical Center. In 2012, the hospital system rebranded from BryanLGH Health System to Bryan Health. In 2019, Bryan began expanding its healthcare further outside of Lincoln. The system purchased Grand Island Regional Medical Center in 2019. It developed Merrick Medical Center, which opened in 2022. It purchased Kearney Regional Medical Center in 2022.

== Healthcare facilities ==
Bryan Health operates six hospitals, 45 physician clinics, four urgent care facilities, and a specialty clinic. Two of their hospitals, Bryan West Campus and Kearney Regional Medical Center, are level II and level III trauma centers respectively. Bryan East Campus is the oldest hospital in the system, being established in 1925.

== Leadership ==
Russ Gronewold was named CEO of Bryan in 2019. He was previously CFO. The appointment was controversial because of Gronewold's prior affiliation with the Nebraska Family Alliance, a socially conservative lobbying group.

== Bryan College of Health Sciences ==
Bryan College of Health Sciences is an undergraduate medical school located on Bryan Health's East Campus. It offers undergraduate degrees in Nursing, Ultrasound, Pre-med, Pre-PT and other health professions, and a Doctoral degree in Nurse Anesthesia Practice an Education Doctorate with Emphasis in Nursing Education and a Masters in Nursing with a track in Leadership or Education to choose from, as well as certificate programs for ancillary health professions. The college is an affiliate of Bryan Health.
