= Nebraska Department of Health and Human Services =

State health department in Nebraska

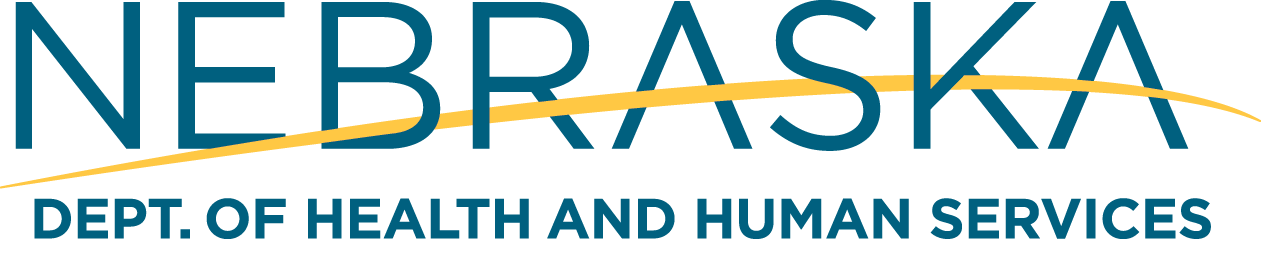

Agency overview
- Formed: July 10, 2007
- Jurisdiction: Nebraska
- Headquarters: 301 Centennial Mall South, Lincoln, Nebraska, U.S. 40.8109°N 96.7005°W
- Employees: 4,651 (2018)
- Annual budget: $3.5 billion (2018)
- Agency executive: Steve Corsi (CEO)
- Website: dhhs.ne.gov

The Nebraska Department of Health and Human Services (DHHS) is the health and human services agency of Nebraska, headquartered in Lincoln. The agency provides health and human services for both families and regular patients. DHHS is Nebraska's largest agency and is responsible for nearly one-third of the state's government, both in employees and budget.

== History ==
The Nebraska Department of Health & Human Services earliest predecessor was established in 1891 as the Nebraska State Board of Health. The organization was created by the Nebraska State Legislature, and originally included four physicians appointed to the board. In 1917, the board was re-organized into the Nebraska State Department of Health, and introduced a state health officer, who would be the head of the department. During the 1918-1920 flu pandemic, the department declared the virus an absolutely quarantinable disease and encouraged quarantine policies on nearby counties.

In 1996, the State Legislature passed a bill merging the department with the departments of Social Services, Public Institutions, and the Office of Juvenile Services. The combined organization would be known as the Department of Health and Human Services. Divisions would include the main organization, a Regulations and Licensure branch, and a Finance and Support branch. The department was formed on December 31, 1996. In 2007, the department underwent a second re-organization, merging the prior divisions into a single organization and creating six new ones. These changes officially went into effect on July 10, 2007.

== Divisions ==
The Nebraska Department of Health & Human Services includes eight divisions. Major divisions include Behavior Health, Children and Family Services, Developmental Disabilities, Medicaid and Long-Term Care, Office of Economic Assistance, and Public Health. Other divisions include Financial Services and Operations. DHHS also operates two juvenile correctional facilities. Youth Rehabilitation & Treatment Center - Kearney is the juvenile correctional facility for boys, located in Kearney. The Youth Rehabilitation & Treatment Center - Geneva is the juvenile correctional facility for girls, located outside of Geneva. The Nebraska Department of Correctional Services previously managed those two facilities until 1997.
