= Bryan Health facilities =

Healthcare facilities in Nebraska, United States

Logo since 2012

Bryan Health operates six hospitals, 45 physician clinics, four urgent care facilities, and a specialty clinic. The organization owns and is affiliated with several hospitals in the state of Nebraska. Two of their hospitals, Bryan West Campus and Kearney Regional Medical Center, are level II and level III trauma centers respectively. Bryan East Campus is the oldest hospital in the system, being established in 1925.

== Bryan Medical Center East Campus ==
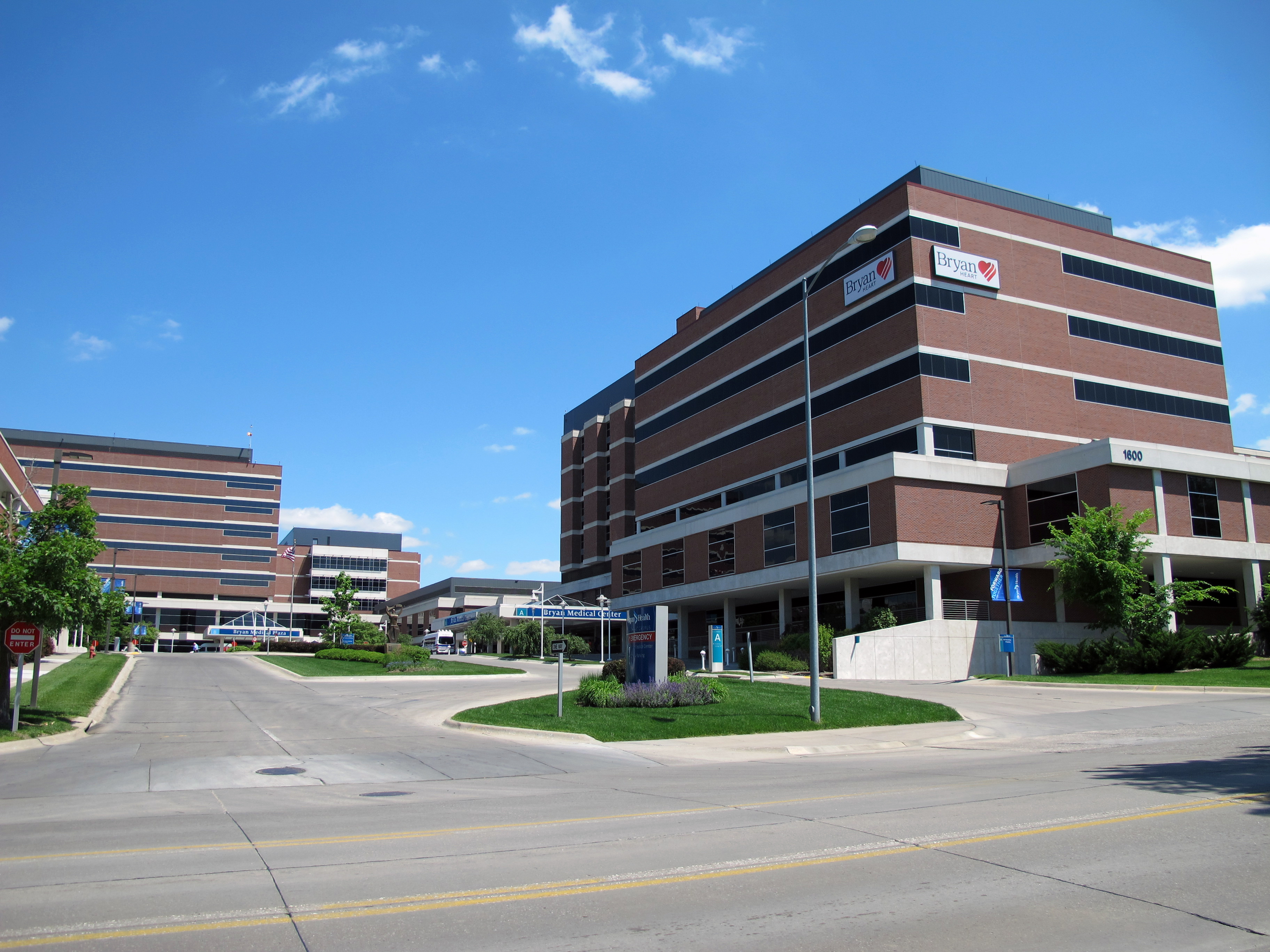
Bryan East Campus in 2015

Bryan Medical Center East Campus is a general hospital in Lincoln, Nebraska. The hospital serves as the East Campus of Bryan Health. The hospital was established in 1926 as Brian Memorial Hospital and is the oldest hospital in the system. Bryan East Campus has a total of 374 beds. The original hospital was expanded three times, in 1930 with the front section, a West wing was added in 1948, and a laboratory was built in 1958. In 1960, construction began on a new hospital, which was completed on October 27, 1963.

In 1980, a series of renovations and expansions were announced for the hospital. The projects struggled to gain approval, and it wasn't until 1982 when expansion broke ground. Renovations were completed in 1989. Expansions also added a new critical care unit. Later in 1989, an additional series of renovations and expansions were announced for the building, including parking, an additional in-patient tower, and a physicians' office building. Most major expansions were completed by 1994. In 1997, In 2016, an outpatient surgery center began construction and was completed in January 2018.

== Bryan Medical Center West Campus ==
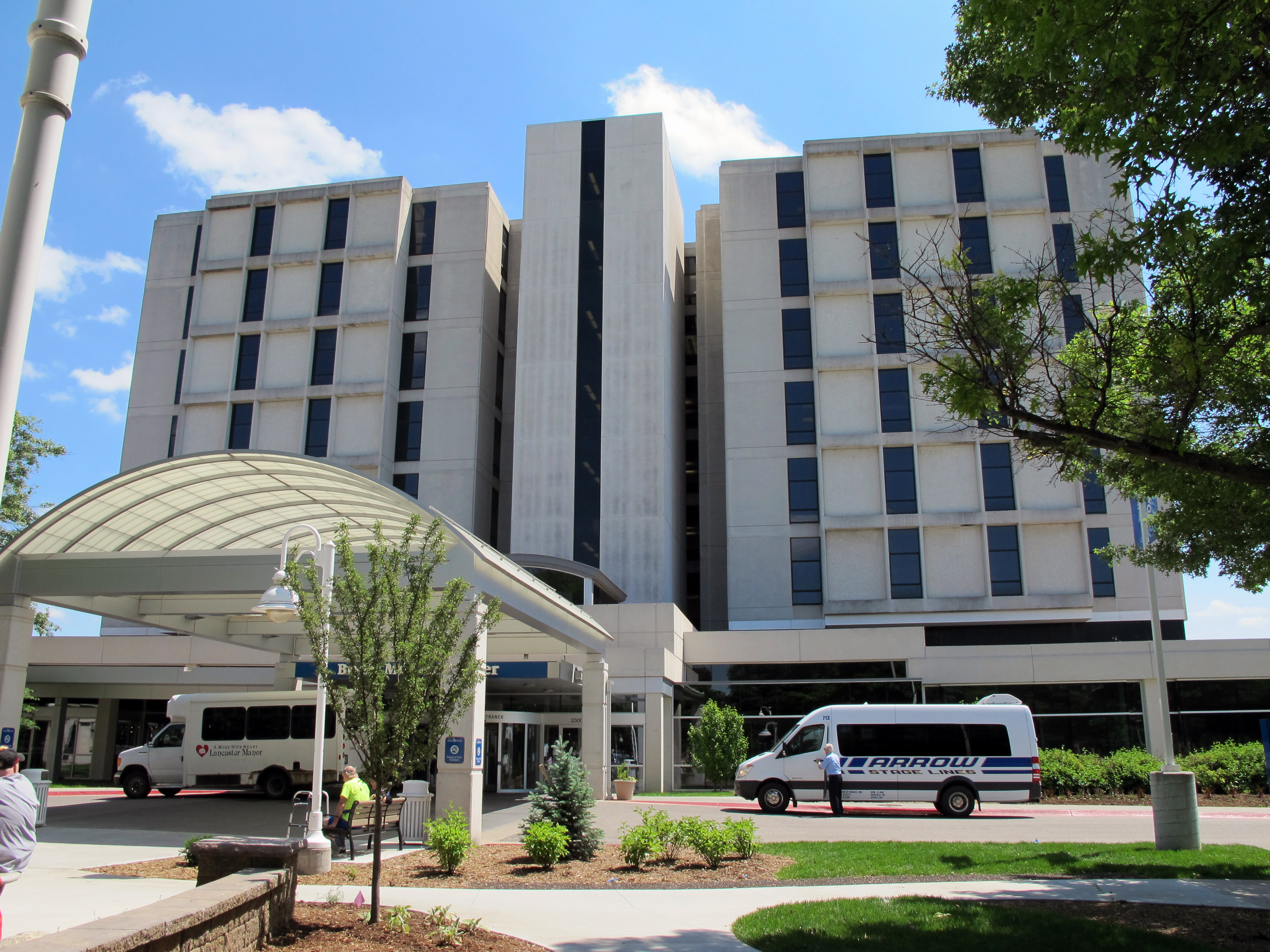
Bryan West Campus in 2015

Bryan Medical Center West Campus is a general hospital in Lincoln, Nebraska. The hospital serves as the West campus of Bryan Health. The hospital is a level II trauma center and includes 290 licensed beds. Originally known as Lincoln General Hospital, it was announced in 1922 and began construction in September 1923. Lincoln General opened in 1925. The hospital announced it would be building a new location in 1963. The building officially opened in 1967. The hospital was renovated between 1985 and 1987. Bryan Memorial Hospital purchased Lincoln General Hospital from the city in 1997, forming BryanLGH. In 2000, a series of renovations and expansions began and were completed in 2007.

== Crete Area Medical Center ==
Crete Area Medical Center is a community hospital in Crete, Nebraska. The hospital has 15 beds. The hospital was originally founded as the Crete Municipal Hospital, which began construction in 1949. The hospital officially opened in August 1950. By 1999, the hospital fell into disrepair, and a new hospital was announced by Bryan Health. Ground was broken on the now current hospital in October 2001. The hospital officially opened in 2003.

== Grand Island Regional Medical Center ==
Grand Island Regional Medical Center is a regional hospital in Grand Island, Nebraska. The hospital has 67 beds. The hospital was announced and began construction in 2017. In 2019, Bryan Health purchased the hospital. The hospital officially opened in 2020. The Morrison Cancer Center opened in the hospital in September 2020.

== Kearney Regional Medical Center ==
Kearney Regional Medical Center is a regional hospital in Kearney, Nebraska. The hospital is a level III trauma center and has 93 beds. The hospital was announced in December 2009 and began construction in 2010. Originally planned to be a physician-owned hospital, then-owners of the hospital transferred ownership to Kansas-based MDM Corp. During construction in 2012, it was announced that the building would be expanded. Kearney Regional Medical Center officially opened in 2014. In 2015, the hospital announced another expansion project, which was completed in 2016. Bryan Health purchased the hospital in 2022.

== Merrick Medical Center ==
Merrick Medical Center is a community hospital in Central City, Nebraska. The hospital began construction in September 2020 and opened in 2022. The hospital has six beds.
