= Southroads Mall =

Shopping mall in Bellevue, Nebraska

Coordinates: 41.178°N 95.926°W

- Location: Bellevue, Nebraska, United States
- Opened: August 1966
- Developer: Brandeis Investment Corp.
- Num. of stores: 5
- Num. of anchor tenants: 2
- Floor area: 500,000 square feet (46,000 m^{2})
- Floors: 2
- Public transit: Metro Transit

Southroads Mall is an enclosed shopping mall at 1001 Fort Crook Road in Bellevue, Nebraska. Fort Crook Road was U.S. Route 75 until the early 1990s, replaced by the Kennedy Freeway.

== History ==
Developed by the Brandeis Investment Corp., Southroads opened in 1966 with an Omaha-based department store, Brandeis, and JCPenney as anchors. The mall has 500,000 square feet (46,000 m^{2}) of retail space, which was modeled after the success of Omaha's Crossroads Mall, which was also developed by Brandeis. Southroads was developed within the Southroads Complex near a Sears, which had been open since 1964. other retail near the mall included a Venture Stores location located just south of the mall and a No Frills supermarket to the left of Venture.

Originally, Southroads Mall was only a one level mall in the beginning but later on, the bottom level of the mall came to be. The remodel would also include a food court, a movie theater, an expansion of both anchors, an elevator, 2 escalators and stairs built on both ends in the mall. It also received a heavy makeover on the inside and outside with a new mall area being built connected outwards. They would also excavate part of the parking lot so the main entrance would be on the lower level. Retail in the mall around this time included Musicland, GNC, Deb, John’s Grecian Delight, Kay-Bee Toys, B. Dalton, Zales, Radio Shack, Claire’s, and many more.

Brandeis was purchased by Younkers in 1987, and converted to the Younkers name, but the store was closed in 1996. The JCPenney anchor was converted to a clearance center in 1999 and was closed in 2003. Venture was likely to have closed in 1998 as part of going out of business and may or may not have become Kmart. Sears ended up closing their doors in 2008.

As retail outlets closed, retail space was converted to office space. TD Ameritrade, headquartered out of Omaha, began leasing space at the mall in 1998, eventually taking over the former Brandeis/Younkers space. PayPal leased space in the former JCPenney, along with CoSentry. TD Ameritrade began shifting employees from Southroads in 2011 and consolidated their offices in West Omaha. By 2015 No Frills Supermarket would close their nearby location and the old Venture space nextdoor would become Marathon Ventures Inc.

Cornerstone Christian School has been a tenant of the former mall property since 2016. Omaha Public Schools has also leased space on the upper floor there.

== Notable local businesses ==
John’s Grecian Delight, Southroads Mall has been home to a host of notable local business including John's Grecian Delight, a fixture in the community since 1983.
