= Barbara F. Lee =

American philanthropist (born 1945)

- Born: Barbara Fish; July 3, 1945 (age 81)
- Education: Simmons College
- Occupation: Philanthropist
- Known for: Founder of Barbara Lee Family Foundation
- Spouse: Thomas H. Lee (m. 1968–1995)

Barbara Fish Lee (born July 3, 1945) is an American philanthropist. She founded and led the Barbara Lee Family Foundation and the Barbara Lee Political Office, both located in Cambridge, Massachusetts until winding down in 2024. Major targets of Lee's donations include Boston's Institute of Contemporary Art and Hillary Clinton's 2016 presidential campaign. In May 2014, the magazine Boston listed Lee among Boston's Most Powerful Thought Leaders.

== Early life ==
Barbara Fish was born on July 3, 1945, to Sidney and Ruth Fish. She was raised in a middle-class Jewish family in West Orange, New Jersey. Her father was a dentist and her mother a homemaker. In high school, she was a cheerleader and basketball player. Lee became a Girl Scout and ran for student government with the encouragement of her grandmother, a suffragist that instilled her early interest in politics.

== Education ==
Lee graduated from the all-women Simmons College in 1967 with a bachelor's degree in Education and French Literature. She earned her master's degree in Social Work from Boston University.

Since 2014, she has funded the Barbara Lee Fellowship for Simmons College students to intern with female legislators. In 2017, Simmons College recognized Lee's work with a lifetime achievement award.

== Career ==
Through Barbara Lee's marriage to Thomas H. Lee and her subsequent divorce, she acquired significant wealth that led her to transition from working as a middle school French teacher to philanthropic roles. In the early 1980s, Lee was invited to the board of the Jewish Community Center of Greater Boston by its treasurer, Steven Grossman.

Following similar appointments to the Isabella Stewart Gardner Museum, Institute of Contemporary Art, and Brandeis University's board of women's studies, Lee decided to engage in strategic philanthropy to expand women's political leadership.

=== Campaign support ===
Lee chooses to support current and potential political candidates as well as artists who are women. While Lee receives some criticism for supporting only woman candidates, she insists that it is not a gender issue. She has contributed upwards of $2.5 million to various campaigns.

Lee co-founded the White House Project with Laura Liswood and Marie Wilson in 1998, creating magazine advertisements that promoted potential female presidential candidates, such as Hillary Clinton and Christine Todd Whitman. The organization contributed to Jennifer Granholm's success in the 2002 Michigan gubernatorial election.

Lee also established the Barbara Lee Family Foundation. The Foundation published its findings on the lack of success for women gubernatorial candidates and ways they could improve their image on the campaign trail in Keys to the Governor’s Office: The Guide for Women Running for Governor. It aims to resolve the tough/soft dilemma of voters paradoxically viewing women candidates as both too aggressive and too delicate.

=== Art collection ===
Lee became interested in modern art after her father took her to the Museum of Modern Art's 50th anniversary exhibit of the Armory Show. Additionally, Lee's mother-in-law, Mildred Schiff Lee, was an early collector of Andy Warhol, Robert Rauschenberg, and Jasper Johns. Inspired by the Guerrilla Girls' protests about the lack of women's art in museums, Lee began donating to the Institute of Contemporary Art in Boston to amass The Barbara Lee Collection of Art by Women. She served them as a Vice Chair on their Board of Trustees in 2020.

== Barbara Lee Family Foundation ==
Barbara Lee founded the Barbara Lee Family Foundation in 1998 to support gender equality in politics. The Foundation's goal is to produce non-partisan research for women candidates, as compared to EMILY's List, which only supports pro-choice Democrats. The Foundation was led by Barbara Lee alongside the executive director, Amanda Hunter.

The Barbara Lee Family Foundation promotes the possibility of successful female presidential candidates by supporting women in lower political positions, such as national and state congressional races. It argues that women increase their perceived self-efficacy to run for office when they see other women occupying political positions like governorships.

In the 2016 election cycle, the Foundation was the 67th biggest contributor to federal candidates, parties, and political action committees (PACs) with $3.4 million in donations entirely spent on Democratic candidates.

In November 2023, Lee announced that she would wind down the foundation's and her political office's work by the end of 2024. When operating, the political office helped elect more than 200 women across 37 states and supported the Joe Biden 2020 presidential campaign to elect Kamala Harris as the first women vice president. It directly contributed $2 million to over 400 women candidates and separately contributed over $2 million to PACs to support the Hillary Clinton 2016 presidential campaign.

== Personal life ==
Barbara Lee was married to investor Thomas H. Lee from 1968 to 1995. Thomas Lee amassed a significant net worth through his private equity investment firm, Thomas H. Lee Partners. The couple had two sons, Zach (born 1971) and Robbie Lee. Lee foreshadowed her own future activism when she gifted all the women at her son Zach's first birthday with copies of the first Ms. magazine, founded by Gloria Steinem and Dorothy Pitman Hughes.

Barbara Lee originally filed for divorce from her husband in 1987 but ended the petition two years later. Following her husband's 1993 affair with Laura Goldman, Barbara divorced Thomas Lee in 1995, leaving her with half of their combined personal wealth (approximately $210 million).
