= Oak View Mall =

Shopping mall in Omaha, Nebraska

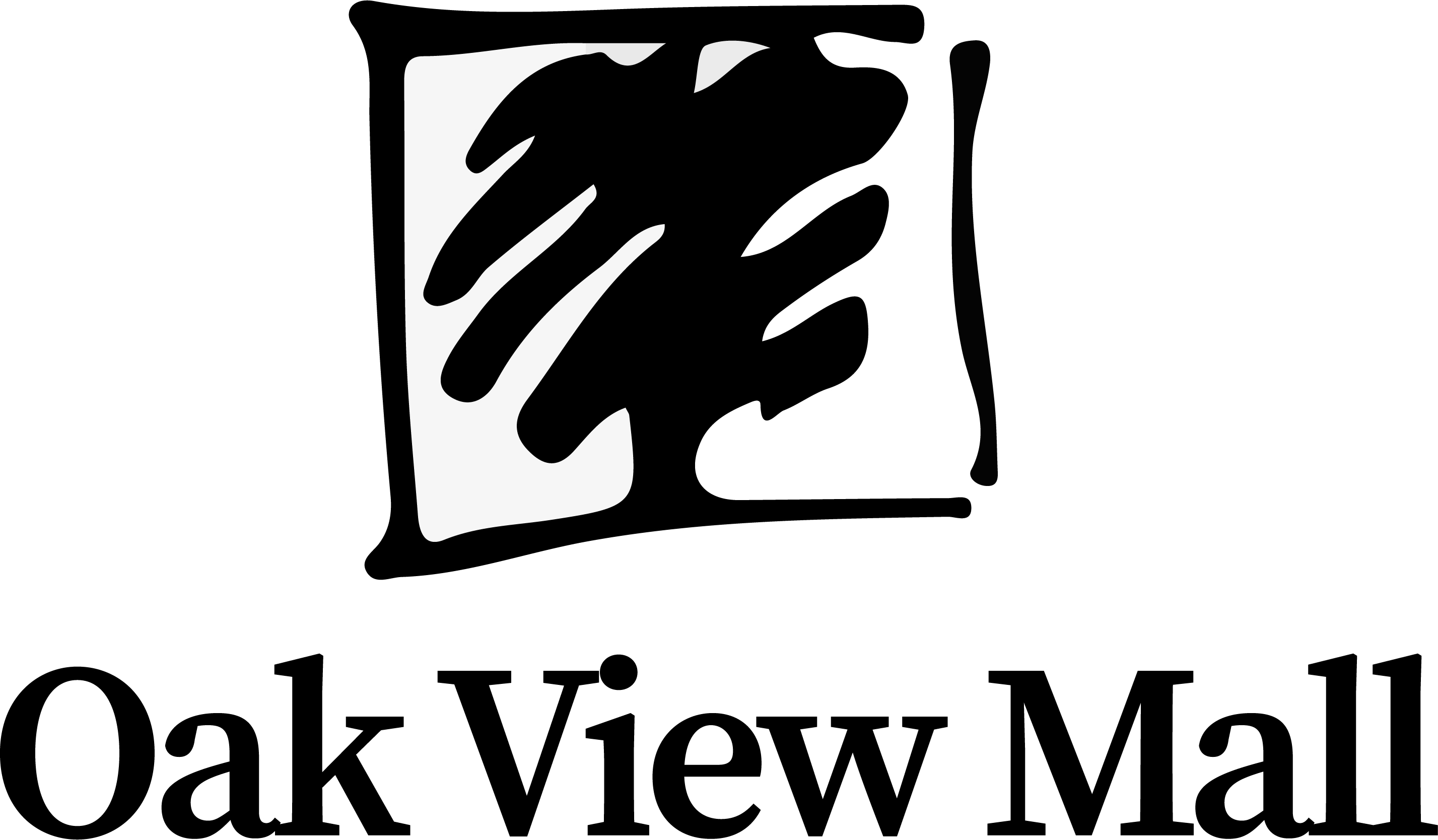

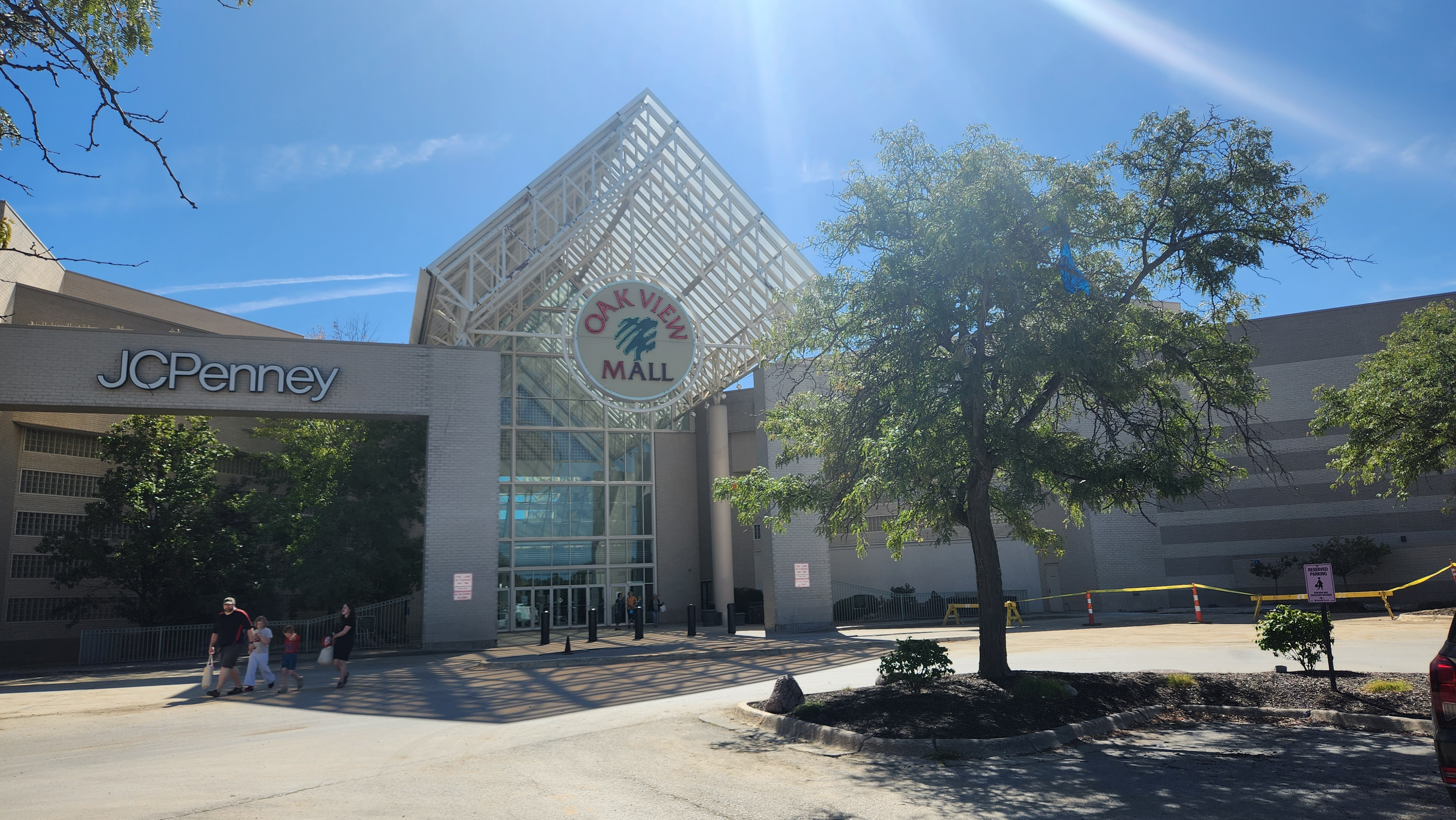
- Location: Omaha, Nebraska
- Coordinates: 41°13′45″N 96°08′04″W
- Address: 3001 South 144th Street
- Opened: October 3, 1991; 35 years ago
- Developer: Melvin Simon & Associates, KVI Associates
- Owner: 4th Dimension Properties
- Num. of stores: 43
- Num. of anchor tenants: 4 (3 open)
- Floor area: 859,439 square feet (79,844.5 m^{2})
- Floors: 2
- Parking: 4,700
- Public transit: Metro Transit
- Website: www.oakviewmall.com

Oak View Mall is an enclosed shopping mall located at 3002 South 145th Street in West Omaha, Nebraska. In recent years, the mall has lost many iconic stores. This has led to the rapid decline of the mall. At its peak, there was 104 tenant spots on two floors of this regional mall, which was built in 1991. The mall is said to be one of America’s many dead malls. However, recent construction has generated the "Kids Coliseum" play area. Oak View was attributed with sparking a development "boom" in its approximate neighborhood, which now includes several major retailers, restaurants, and three national hotel chains. The mall's anchor stores are Dillard's, JCPenney and The Rush Market. There is one vacant anchor that served as the former location of The Rush Market as well as formerly housing a Younkers.

== History ==
The mall opened in 1991. Official opening ceremonies held on October 3 of that year and included an appearance by Vanna White. At the time, the 730,000-square-foot (68,000 m^{2}) mall was the first enclosed mall to be built in Omaha in over 20 years. Melvin Simon & Associates (now known as Simon Property Group) developed the mall with local developer KVI Associates. After only one year, Simon sold the mall to Heitman Retail. A Barnes & Noble store opened outside the mall on July 7, 1995. Sears began negotiations to open at the mall in 1996.

In 2005, the mall was the location of an attempted mall shooting similar to what happened at Westroads Mall in Omaha in December 2007. A security guard supervisor was allegedly fired for disarming and apprehending a suspected mall shooter before Omaha police were called to the scene. In August 2007 the Firefighter's Combat Challenge was held at the mall and broadcast on ESPN. Shoe Dept. Encore opened a store in the mall in 2013.

=== Recent History ===
Between 2015 and 2016, Wet Seal, Eddie Bauer, Deb Shops, Aéropostale, and Hollister Co. all closed stores at the mall, while Payless ShoeSource and Vanity (clothing) closed their stores as part of a nationwide bankruptcy liquidation. In 2018, the mall lost its Sears and Younkers anchor stores. In 2019, Rush Market Furniture Store assumed the vacant Younkers space, until it later moved to the former Sears.

The Mall further declined during the COVID-19 pandemic; the occupancy rate declined to 79% by October 2020. The mall has been sold twice since then, first to Kohan Retail Investment Group for $7.5 million in April 2021, then to 4th Dimension Properties in December 2023. Anchor store Rush Market Furniture announced its closure in 2024. By January 2026, only 30 stores remained in the mall. That same year, longtime anchor Dillard's announced it would move to a new location at Westroads Mall in Spring 2027.
