= Gold and Company =

Department store in Lincoln, Nebraska, US

Gold and Company Department Store
- Type: Division
- Industry: Retail
- Founded: 1915; 111 years ago, in Lincoln, Nebraska, U.S.
- Defunct: 1980
- Fate: Acquired by Brandeis; later folded
- Headquarters: 1033 O Street, Lincoln, Nebraska, U.S.
- Key people: William Gold, founder, Nathan Gold, vice president
- Parent: Brandeis

Gold and Company (commonly referred to as Gold's) was an American department store located in downtown Lincoln, Nebraska, United States. The store was founded in 1915 and quickly grew into one of Lincoln's dominant retailers throughout the 20th century. Gold's merged with the Brandeis department store in 1964 and closed in 1980.

== History ==
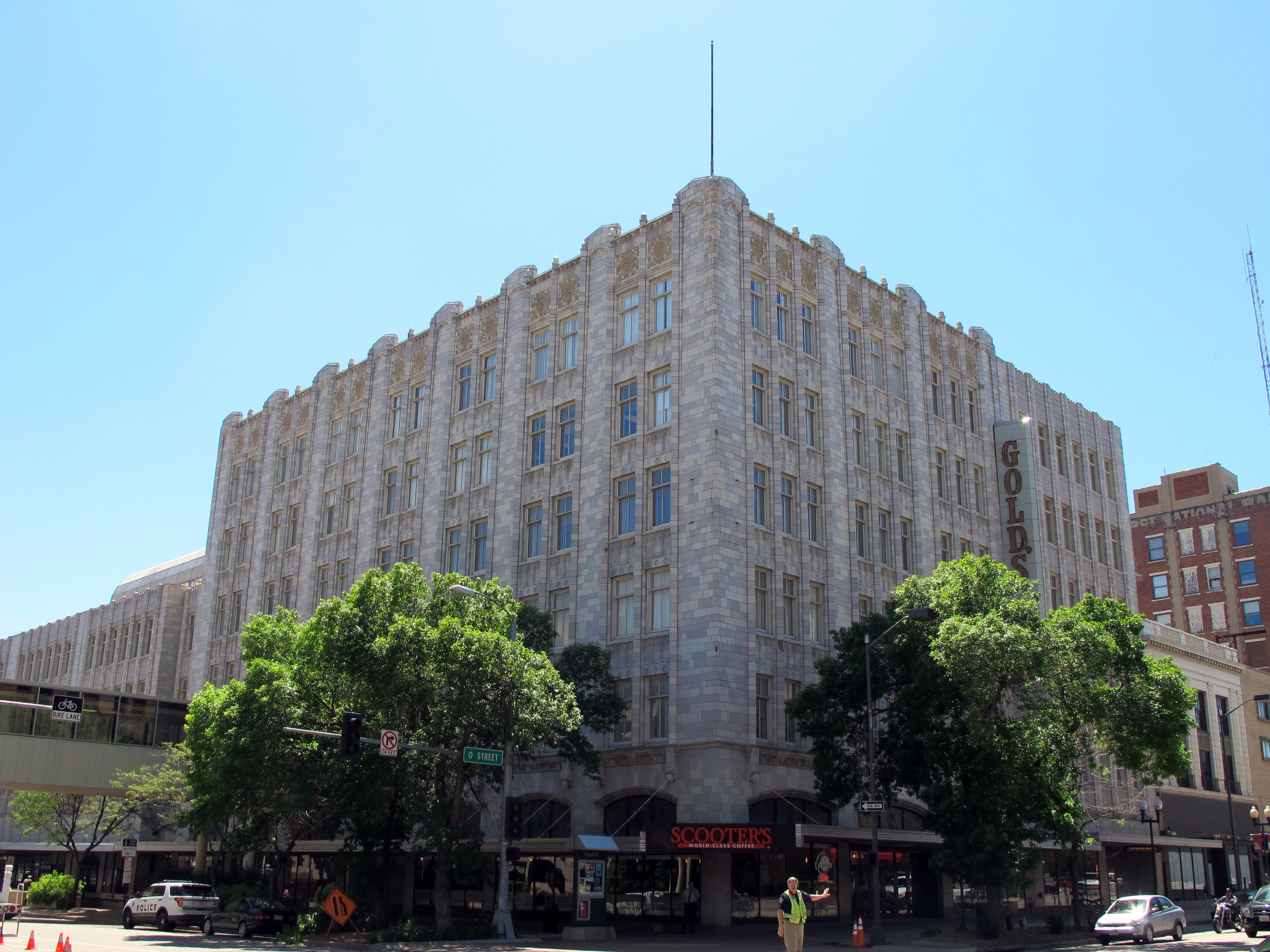
Gold's building downtown Lincoln, Nebraska

Originally founded in 1902 by William Gold and Martin Coen, the store was named Coen and Gold for one year until Gold bought out his partner. He renamed it to The People's Store until he incorporated with his son, Nathan J. Gold, officially becoming Gold and Company in 1915. The store was originally located at 110 N. 10th Street. In 1919, the store moved to a larger four-story building at 1029 O Street. The largest location was at southwest corner of 11th and O Streets, a six-story building in Lincoln, Nebraska, was built in 1924. The building grew with the business, with additions in 1929, 1931, 1936, 1947, and 1951.

=== Acquisition by Brandeis ===
An Omaha-based department store Brandeis merged with Gold's in 1964 to become Brandeis, Gold's Division. Brandeis operated the store for several years until 1980 when the company was shattered also forcing them to sell the downtown Omaha Brandeis flagship shortly after. The former Gold's building is now Gold's Galleria, a mix of retail stores and offices.

=== Redevelopment ===
In early 2023, the city has begun tearing down parts of the historical building originally as part of a "rehabitability" plan. A Hampton Inn is to take the place of the North Tower. Eventually, the developers hope to turn the South Tower into shops and office space.

== See also ==
- List of defunct department stores of the United States
