= Crossroads Mall (Nebraska) =

Shopping mall in Omaha, Nebraska, U.S.

The Crossroads
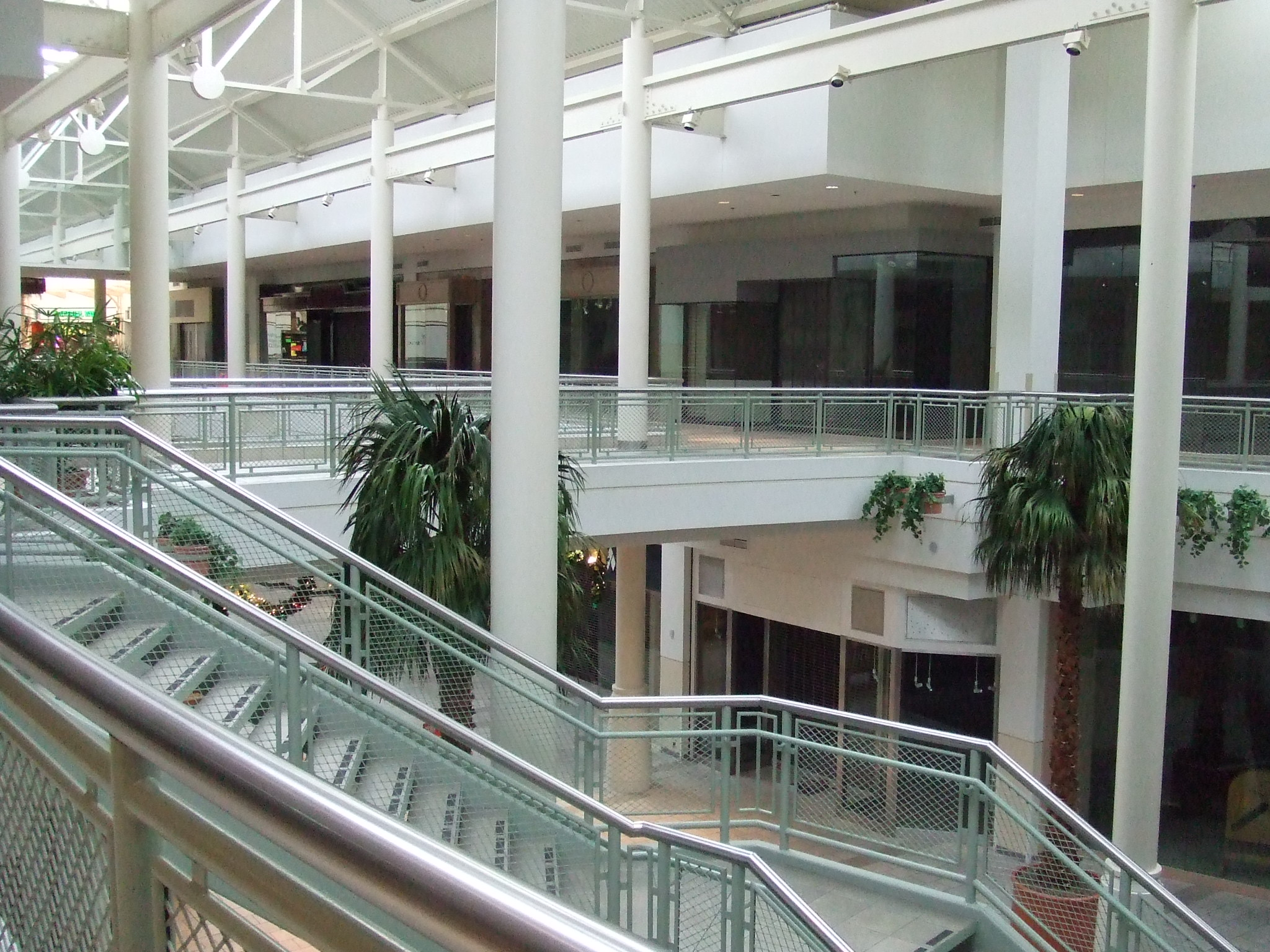
- The north wing of Crossroads Mall completed in 1988, now demolished
- Location: Omaha, Nebraska, United States
- Coordinates: 41.261453°N 96.026216°W
- Opened: September 10, 1960
- Closed: September 2020 (Demolition from December 9, 2020 to late May 2021)
- Developer: Brandeis Investment Company
- Owner: The City of Omaha
- Architect: Leo A. Daly
- Num. of stores: 0
- Num. of anchor tenants: 3 (2 demolished, 1 open)
- Floor area: 753,000 sq ft (70,000 m^{2})
- Floors: 0 (demolished) (formerly 2 with a small basement, second floor closed around 2008-2009)
- Parking: Parking garage (being remodeled) and (currently) one parking lot
- Public transit: Metro Transit
- Website: www.thecrossroadsomaha.com

Crossroads Mall was an enclosed shopping mall located in Omaha, Nebraska, United States, at the intersection of 72nd and Dodge Streets. Originally opened in 1960 by Omaha's Brandeis department store, the mall has been home to several major chains, including Sears, Target and Dillard's before the store closed in 2008. The mall is now demolished, and is expected to be redeveloped as a mixed-use center, called The Crossroads, in 2025.

== History ==
=== Background ===
Crossroads Mall was originally developed as the Crossroads Shopping Center by J. L. Brandeis and Sons. The mall was developed after Brandeis Investment Co., the real estate division of Brandeis, obtained a 96-year lease on the northwest corner of 72nd and Dodge streets. Brandeis, based in Downtown Omaha, previously turned down an offer to open a store at the Center Mall, preferring to build further out west. It was naturally seen as inevitable that the city would reach further out west to what was of the uninhabited area where Crossroads was built.

=== Construction ===
Crossroads Shopping Center was designed by Leo A. Daly and cost $10 million to build. The original design of the mall primarily one-story design, with both the Sears and Brandeis stores being three-stories tall. Crossroads began construction in 1959. Crossroad's development marked a turning point in Downtown Omaha's history, as many businesses began to move further west, away from Downtown. Crossroads Shopping Center officially opened on September 10, 1960. Upon its opening, it was the largest indoor shopping mall in the state of Nebraska. The mall also had the first official Brandeis store to open since 1906. Another part of the design, the marquee, was located at the edge of 72nd and Dodge.

=== Renovations ===
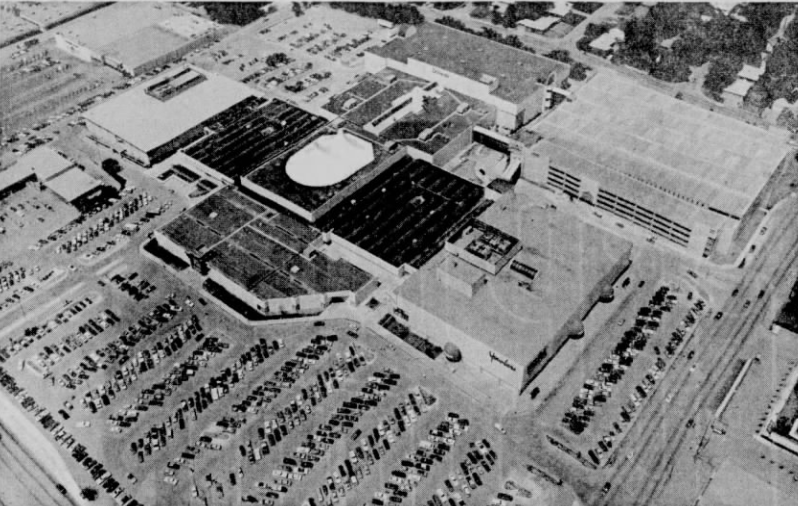
Crossroads Mall following renovations in 1988

While Crossroads Shopping Center dominated the retail scene of Omaha, the opening of Westroads Mall brought increased competition to the area. By 1980, Brandeis closed its downtown locations in both Omaha and Lincoln, leaving the location at Crossroads the flagship location. Crossroads Mall was purchased by Melvin Simon & Associates in 1984. Melvin Simon & Associates announced a $35 million renovation plan for the mall upon purchasing the building. However, due to issues with tenants, renovations were delayed to 1986. The sign to the corner of the development, originally made of wood, was replaced with an electronic display in 1985.

Construction for the large-scale renovation and expansion of Crossroads Mall began in February 1986. In 1987, Brandeis sold to Younkers, with all locations, including the location at Crossroads, being converted to Younkers stores. During renovations, Dillard's announced that it would be adding a 200,000 square feet (19,000 m^{2}) to the mall as a third anchor. It wasn't until 1988 that the renovation and expansion project at Crossroads Mall was completed. During renovations to the building, the mall was expanded to two-stories tall. Additionally, more parking space was added, with a six-story parking garage being built north of the mall. Expansions also brought the mall a central food court, neon lighting, and a new color scheme.

In 1998, the mall underwent a smaller, mostly cosmetic remodel in which the color scheme and furnishings were updated to more neutral colors. New directional signage was added in the mall and the parking garage, and a large lighted food court sign was added over the escalator leading up to the food court. The main south entrance was also updated with a new "compass" logo, new logotype, and faux windows above the existing windows.

=== Younkers and Dillard's exit and decline in stores ===
Younkers closed its store in early 2005. Target acquired building permits that same year and had the building demolished for a new store. Despite speculation that the new Target would be two floors like some of its other urban locations, the new store has one level of retail space with entrances to the south surface parking lot and into the mall. Unlike the former Younkers space, the Target store is not connected to the parking garage. Instead, the sky walk that used to open into Younkers now leads to a new stairway down to the mall level in an expanded entrance north of Target's mall entrance.

By the late 2000s, the mall was struggling. The larger Westroads (less than three miles (5 km) away) and Oak View Mall, as well as the "lifestyle centers" Village Pointe and Shadow Lake were drawing customers away from Crossroads. Nearly 50 percent of the mall was vacant around this time. Dillard's announced that it would change to being a Dillard's Clearance Center before closing their store the following year. In mid-June 2009, Simon Malls announced that Crossroads was for sale. Simon did not announce the price of the property, however in 2002, the mall was appraised at approximately $57 million. Ideas for redevelopment of Crossroads included a complex for residential and commercial.

Having received several bids for the mall that were deemed too low, Simon Property Group defaulted on their mortgage payments, sending the mall into foreclosure. A foreclosure sale by the lender was scheduled on March 4, 2010. The mall changed hands that March, going to CW Capital for $40.6 million, who turned around and sold it in June 2010 for an undisclosed amount. Century Development was the current owner, who displayed a strong concern for taking the mall in the right direction for Omaha.

=== Closing and demolition ===
Century Development announced a plan in 2015 to begin demolition on the mall except for Target and a parking garage, as well as a parcel to the west of the mall. The developers planned to seek tax incentives through the Nebraska Legislature. This plan did not come to fruition. On December 28, 2018, Sears announced that its store at the mall would be closing in March 2019 as part of a plan to close 80 stores nationwide, which left Target as the only operating anchor.

On April 7, 2020, it was announced again that Crossroads Mall was to be demolished, and that tenants would have 30 days to move. The demolition was to begin in May, however, the deadline was missed. The Barnes & Noble closed on April 25, 2020. The mall itself closed around September 2020.

On August 5, 2020, Century Development and new partner Lockwood Development announced a new redevelopment plan for the mall site. The Target and the existing parking garage will remain (albeit remodeled), but the rest of the mall's structure will be demolished. A property immediately west of the mall that had been built in 1967 as a Gulf Mart discount store and was later home to other retailers including Best Buy and a Bag 'n Save, plus an Applebee's restaurant just south of the former mall's entrance that was facing Dodge Street, would also be cleared. In its place will stand 150,000 square feet of entertainment/lifestyle, 200,000 square feet of retail, 150 hotel rooms, 400 residences, up to 500,000 square feet of office space, and a "signature" pavilion, totaling around 1.5 million square feet. This area will be dubbed The Crossroads, and its construction was supposed to be complete some time in 2024, however, as of 2026, it is still a dirt lot.

On December 9, 2020, demolition of Crossroads Mall began on the former Sears Auto Center.

== Design ==
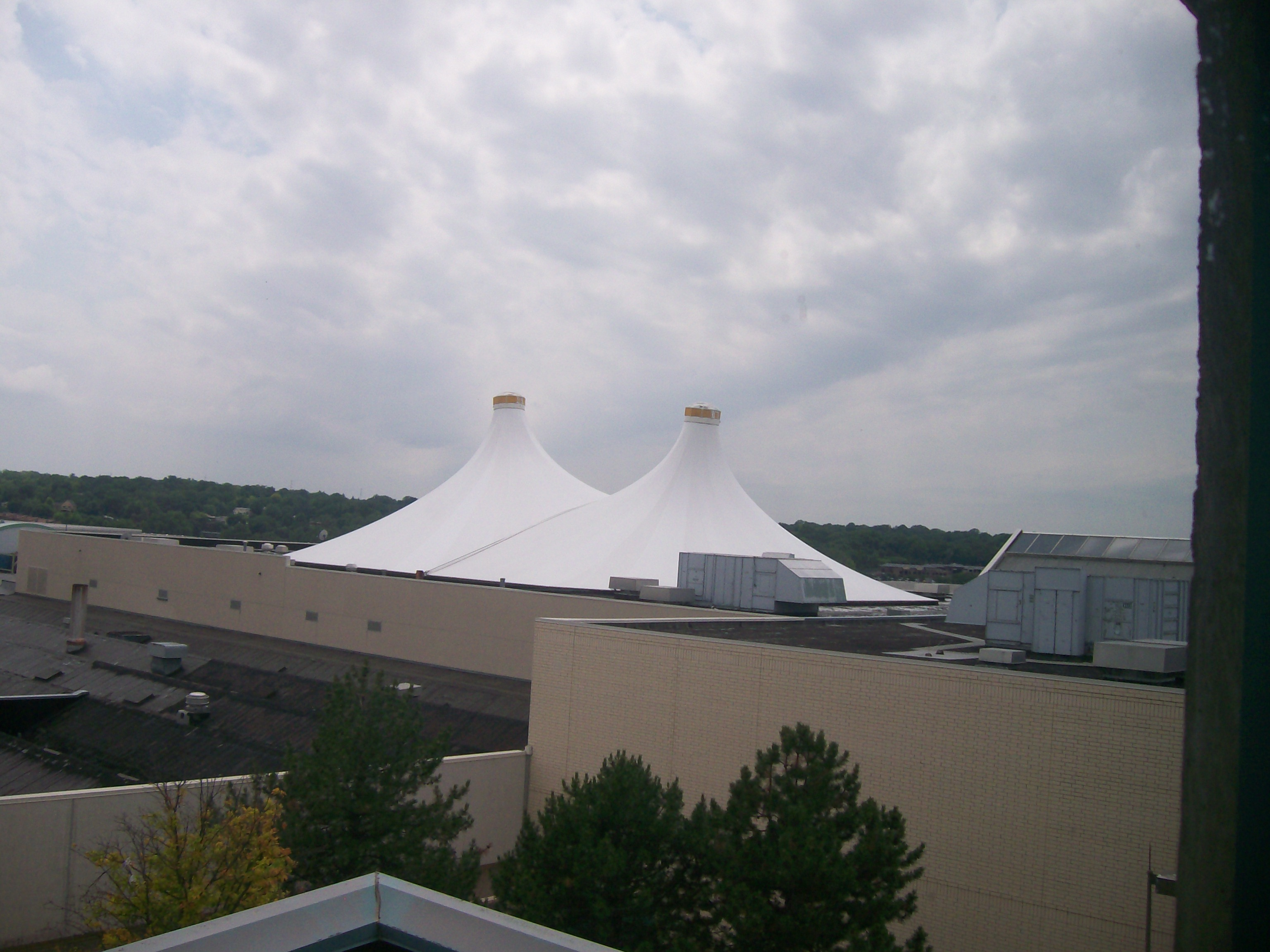
The membrane tents over the food court of Crossroads Mall, as seen from the top floor of the parking garage. The tents became an icon in the Omaha area over the past 20 years.

Crossroads was an enclosed mall with 2 levels of retail space. A third level (basement) housed the mall management office. The mall featured a 2nd level food court that overlooked the center court and was housed under a unique large white membrane "tent" with 2 peaks. However, the food court was closed around 2008 and no stores were open on the second floor, so this floor had been closed. The north wing had large skylights running the entire length of the corridor, while the east, west, and south wings did not have natural lighting.
