= Thomas H. Lee (businessman) =

American investor (1944–2023)

- Born: March 27, 1944; New York City, U.S.
- Died: February 23, 2023 (aged 78); New York City, U.S.
- Education: Harvard University (BA)
- Occupation: Private equity investor
- Employer: Lee Equity Partners
- Known for: Founding Thomas H. Lee Partners in 1974; Founding Lee Equity Partners in 2006
- Spouses: Barbara Fish (divorced); Ann Tenenbaum
- Children: 5

Thomas Haskell Lee (March 27, 1944 – February 23, 2023) was an American billionaire businessman, financier, and investor credited with being one of the early pioneers in private equity and specifically leveraged buyouts. Thomas H. Lee Partners (THL), the firm he founded in 1974, is among the oldest and largest private equity firms globally. At the time of his death, he was the managing partner of Lee Equity Partners, a private equity firm he founded in 2006 after leaving Thomas H. Lee Partners. According to Forbes, he had a net worth of $2 billion at the time of his death.

== Early career ==
Lee was born in 1944 to a Jewish family, the son of Herbert C. Lee (formerly Leibowitz) and Mildred "Micki" Schiff Lee. His father worked for the Shoe Corporation of America, founded by his father-in-law Robert Schiff, and later was chairperson of Shoe Corporation of Canada and Clark International Corp. He had two brothers: Richard S. Lee and Jonathan O. Lee. Lee attended Belmont Hill School and graduated from Harvard College in 1965, quickly going to work as an analyst in the institutional research department of L.F. Rothschild in New York City. The next year, Lee went to work for the First National Bank of Boston, where he spent eight years ultimately rising to the rank of vice president in 1973.

Lee is said to have begun investing with a $150,000 inheritance.

=== Thomas H. Lee Partners ===
In 1974, Lee founded a new investment firm to focus on acquiring companies through leveraged buyout transactions. By the mid-1980s, Thomas H. Lee Partners was firmly established among the top tier of a new class of private equity investors, while taking a friendlier approach than the so-called corporate raiders of the era (e.g., Nelson Peltz, Ronald Perelman, Carl Icahn). One of the firm's early successes was the 1985 acquisition of Akron, Ohio-based Sterling Jewelers for $28 million. Lee reportedly put in less than $3 million and when the company was sold two years later for $210 million, he walked away with over $180 million in profits. The combined company was an early predecessor to what is now Signet Group, one of Europe's largest jewelry retail chains. In 1992, THL's acquisition of Snapple Beverages marked the resurrection of the leveraged buyout after several dormant years in the wake of the RJR Nabisco takeover, the fall of Michael Milken, and the collapse of Drexel Burnham Lambert in the late 1980s and early 1990s.

After ceding public attention to his competitors, most notably Kohlberg Kravis Roberts & Co., the Snapple Beverages transaction catapulted Lee to prominence. Only eight months after buying the company, Lee took Snapple Beverages public and in 1994, only two years after the original acquisition, Lee sold the company to Quaker Oats for $1.7 billion. Lee was estimated to have made $900 million for himself and his investors from the sale. Quaker Oats would subsequently sell the company, which performed poorly under new management, three years later, for only $300 million. From 1974 through 2006, THL raised more than $22 billion of capital in six institutional private equity funds and completed more than 100 investments, representing in excess of $125 billion of aggregate purchase price.

The final years of Lee's tenure at THL were marred to a certain extent by the firm's investment in Refco, a financial services company specializing in commodities and futures contracts that collapsed suddenly in October 2005, only months after its IPO. THL as the lead investor (and Lee himself) was named in a class action shareholder lawsuit against Refco, along with Goldman Sachs, Credit Suisse, Bank of America, and Grant Thornton.

=== Resignation and later career ===
In March 2006, Lee resigned from Thomas H. Lee Partners as the firm was nearing completion of fundraising for its sixth and then-current private equity fund. In the same year, Lee formed Lee Equity Partners, a private equity firm focused more on growth capital transactions than the leveraged buyouts favored by THL. Lee, who had limited his day-to-day involvement in the firm and had relocated to New York City, told staff that the parting was "very friendly," an account backed up by another insider, who described it as "completely friendly and amicable."

== Philanthropy ==
Lee donated $22 million to Harvard University. Lee was a trustee of Lincoln Center, the Museum of Modern Art, the Whitney Museum of American Art, the Museum of Jewish Heritage, Brandeis University, Cardozo Law School at Yeshiva University, Combined Jewish Philanthropies of Greater Boston, Harvard University, the Intrepid Museum Foundation, NYU Medical Center, and Rockefeller University. He was a major donor to James Turrell's Roden Crater project.

== Personal life ==
Lee was married twice. He and first wife, Barbara Fish Lee, divorced in 1995, after he made public that he had an affair with a woman who was later tried for extortion. Lee's second wife was Ann Tenenbaum of Savannah, Georgia. Lee had five children.

Lee was an avid art collector and a friend of Bill Clinton and Hillary Clinton. In June 2008, at the conclusion of Hillary's unsuccessful presidential run, she and Bill were reported to have stayed at his East Hampton, New York, beach-front home for a few days while she was out of the public eye.

At the time of his death, Forbes estimated his net worth at $2 billion.

=== Death ===
On February 23, 2023, Lee died from a self-inflicted gunshot wound at his office in Manhattan, at age 78.
