= J. L. Brandeis and Sons =

J.L. Brandeis & Sons
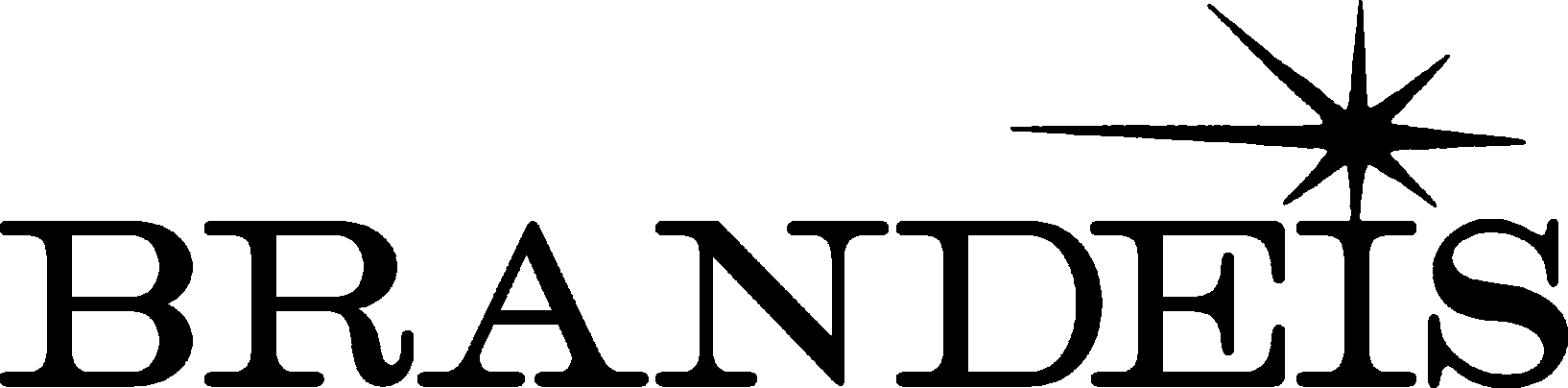

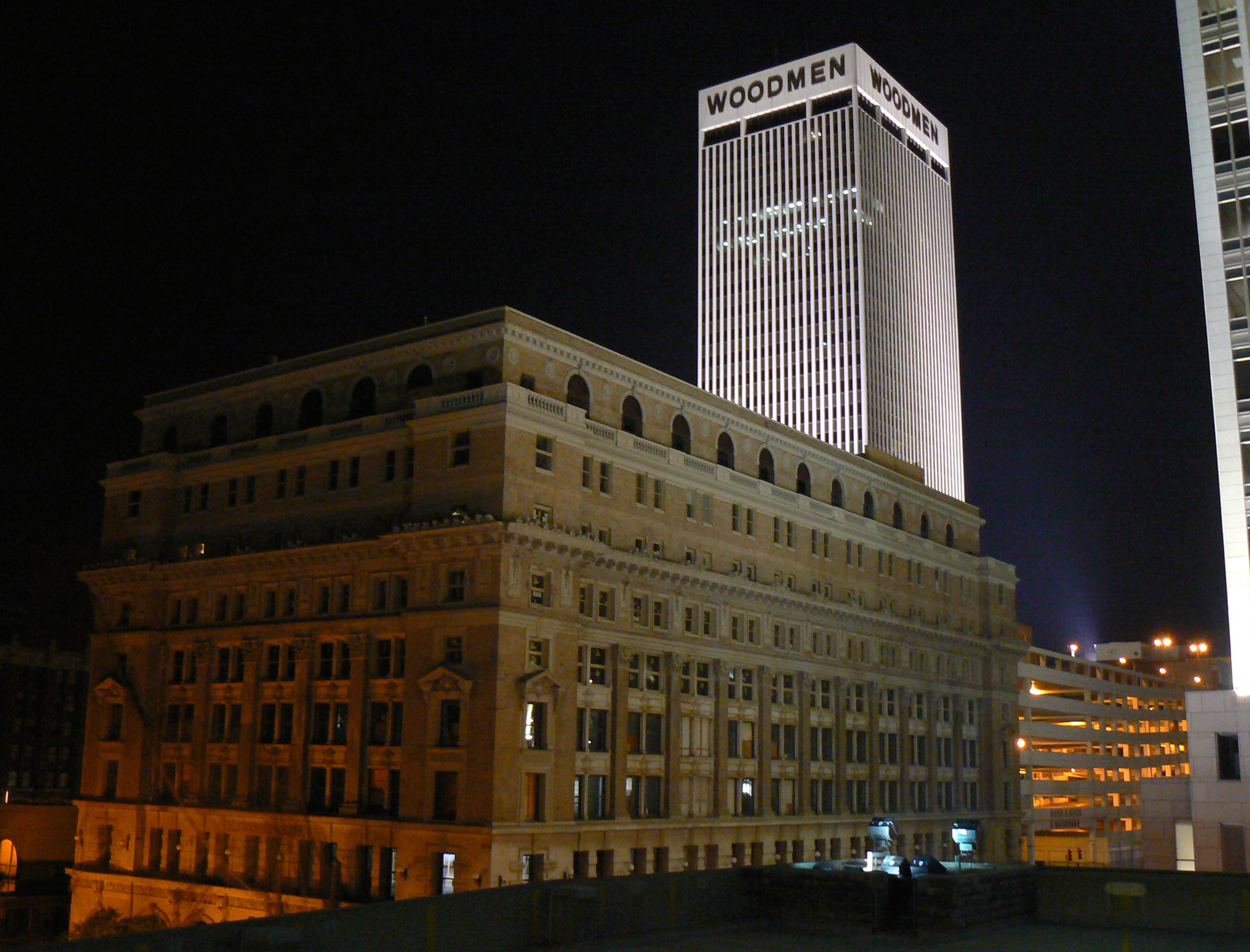
- The Brandeis Building in downtown Omaha
- Type: Division
- Industry: Retail
- Founded: 1881; 145 years ago
- Founder: Jonas Leopold Brandeis
- Defunct: 1987
- Fate: Acquired by Younkers
- Headquarters: Omaha, Nebraska, U.S.

J.L. Brandeis & Sons, commonly referred to by Midwesterners as Brandeis, was a chain of department stores located in the Omaha, Nebraska area started by Jonas L. Brandeis in 1881. It was purchased by Younkers for $33.9 million (~$82.3 million in 2025) in 1987, when the stores were converted to the Younkers name.

== History ==
Jonas Leopold Brandeis's first retail store, called The Fair, was located at 506 South 13th Street. In 1888 he opened the Boston Store on the northwest corner of 16th and Douglas. By 1905, work had begun on a grander Brandeis flagship store at 16th and Douglas Streets in Downtown Omaha. The store was completed in 1906. The eight-story building was designed by John Latenser, Sr., and contained retail space on the first three stories and the basement. Two additional stories were added later. The total cost of the original structure was $650,000. By the 1950s Brandeis took up the whole facility. The store strove to carry every item possible, including furniture.

The Brandeis building is constructed on a steel frame and is faced with Bedford limestone, brick and terra cotta. Design elements vary by floor to add architectural interest. A balustrade and a projecting cornice decorate the upper stories.

=== Developing the mall ===
By the late 1950s, Brandeis was looking for a way to expand and to modernize. One way to do this was by creating malls, anchored by Brandeis. In 1959, Brandeis Investment Co. developed the Crossroads Shopping Center in Midtown Omaha. The mall was also anchored by Sears which closed in 2019. Crossroads was the 9th enclosed shopping mall in the United States and became the place to be in Omaha. The simple mall design, connecting the three-story anchors by an "arcade level", soon proved to be successful when Brandeis opened Southroads Mall in southern Omaha in 1966. Southroads was designed after Crossroads, but was anchored by Brandeis and JCPenney.

=== Merge with Gold's ===
Brandeis acquired Gold and Company, a Lincoln-based department store, in 1964. The Gold's flagship store, in downtown Lincoln, was the only store in the company but took up a large portion of the Lincoln market. Gold's kept their name but operated as a division of J.L. Brandeis until it was phased out of the chain and closed in 1981.

=== Golden age of Brandeis ===
At the top of its game, Brandeis had around fifteen department stores in its chain. The flagship store downtown had become one of Omaha's most prized symbols of modern culture. Brandeis was Nebraska's department store. The chain had its peak in the early 1970s with 3,000 employees and $100 million in sales. The Crossroads Mall store opened in 1960 with mixed results but soon took off and proved to be one of the best stores in the chain, earning an average of $38 million (~$316 million in 2025). Crossroads proved to be extremely successful for Brandeis, despite the risk of opening the first new Brandeis in 50 years. Locations opened across the entire state, downtown (Columbus and Hastings) and in the malls (Conestoga in Grand Island, Southroads & Westroads in Omaha, and Gateway in Lincoln). Soon locations were developed in Iowa, at Midlands Mall in Council Bluffs and Valley West Mall in Des Moines.

=== Downfall and acquisition by Younkers ===
Brandeis lost its major store and much of its public approval when the flagship store closed in 1980. The downtown Lincoln (former Gold's) location followed soon after in 1981. It was the end of an era. The Crossroads anchor became the new flagship store, but had lost its power over the Omaha and Nebraska markets. When plans came for a new Dillard's at Crossroads Mall in the mid-1980s, Brandeis executives knew that there was no chance of competition. They made a deal with Younkers, another department store based out of Des Moines, and sold its chain to Younkers in 1987. Younkers kept 11 of the stores and converted them to the Younkers name.

== See also ==
- Brandeis-Millard House
- J. L. Brandeis and Sons Store Building

== Jingle ==
"Everything you want is at Brandeis."

"We Care About You" at Brandeis
