= Lee Equity Partners =

American private equity firm

- Company type: Private
- Industry: Private equity
- Predecessor: Thomas H. Lee Partners
- Founded: August 18, 2006; 19 years ago
- Founder: Thomas H. Lee
- Headquarters: General Motors Building, New York City, United States
- Products: Growth capital
- AUM: $3.0 billion
- Number of employees: 20+
- Website: leeequity.com

Lee Equity Partners is an American private equity firm focused on growth capital investments in middle-market companies across a range of industries.

== History ==
The firm is based in New York City and it was founded in 2006 by Thomas H. Lee, the notable private equity investor who previously founded Thomas H. Lee Partners and also owns the Blue Star group of fund of hedge funds.

In March 2006, Thomas H. Lee resigned from Thomas H. Lee Partners as the firm was nearing completion of fundraising for its sixth private equity fund. In the same year, Lee formed Lee Equity Partners, a private equity firm focused on the same leveraged buyout transactions that he had been completing for nearly 35 years at THL.

Both Lee and THL insisted that the move was amicable; however, persistent reports suggested that Lee, who had limited his day-to-day involvement in the firm and had relocated to New York City, had been pushed out by several partners.

Among the first professionals to join Lee Equity Partners included Mark Gormley, a founding partner of Capital Z Partners; David Morrison, former president and CEO of Mercer Management Consulting; and Allen Questrom, former CEO of J.C. Penney Company, Barneys New York, Federated Department Stores and Neiman Marcus. The firm also brought in former investment professionals from Bain Capital and The Carlyle Group.

The firm's first investments included the acquisition of Deb Shops in 2007.
