= Westroads Mall shooting =

Mass shooting in Omaha, Nebraska

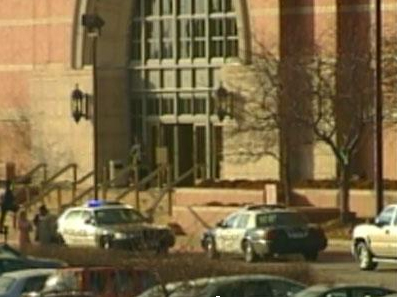
- Police cars cordoned in front of the Von Maur department store building
- Location: Omaha, Nebraska, U.S.
- Date: December 5, 2007; 18 years ago 1:43 – 1:49 p.m. (CST; UTC−06:00)
- Target: Customers at Von Maur department store in Westroads Mall
- Attack type: Mass murder; mass shooting; murder–suicide
- Weapon: WASR-10 7.62×39mm semi-automatic rifle
- Deaths: 9 (including the perpetrator)
- Injuries: 5 (4 from gunfire, 1 injured by escape accident)
- Perpetrator: Robert Arthur Hawkins
- Motive: Infamy; Mental health issue; Trauma trigger

On December 5, 2007, 19-year-old Robert Arthur Hawkins fatally shot eight people and injured four others in a Von Maur department store at Westroads Mall in Omaha, Nebraska, before dying by suicide. It was the deadliest shooting rampage in Nebraska since the rampage of Charles Starkweather in 1958.

== Prior to shooting ==
An hour before the rampage, Hawkins' mother gave the Sarpy County Sheriff's Department his suicide note, which read in part: "I just want to take a few peices [sic] of shit with me... just think tho, I'm gonna be fuckin famous."

Surveillance footage showed that Hawkins, unarmed at first, entered the south entrance of the Von Maur department store at about 1:36 p.m. CST (19:36 UTC). After walking a short distance into the store, he scanned the area, turned around, and left. Returning six minutes later through the same entrance, he proceeded directly to the elevator to his right, this time with a Century WASR-10 (a commercial copy of the AKM (7.62×39mm) semi-automatic rifle) stolen from his stepfather's house, along with two 30-round magazines taped together, concealed in a sweatshirt. He took the elevator to the top floor.

== Shooting ==
At 1:43 p.m. CST (19:43 UTC), Hawkins stepped out of the elevator on the third floor and opened fire. He first killed two women standing by some clothing racks before firing down the atrium, killing two men on the first and second floors. He then wounded two people on the third floor, one fatally, before walking to the customer service desk, where he shot several people, killing three. Hawkins then died via suicide by shooting himself upwards through the chin. He had two full 30-round magazines taped together, and had fired 41 rounds, including his suicide shot, striking 12 people. Six were killed instantly, one died before reaching the hospital, and another died 45 minutes after reaching the ER of another hospital.

Omaha Police arrived at Westroads Mall about six minutes after receiving the first 911 call. Audio tapes and transcripts of the 911 calls, along with images captured by mall security surveillance cameras, were released by the police on December 7, 2007. In one 911 call, gunshots can be heard.

An autopsy of Hawkins showed that he had 200 nanograms per milliliter of Valium in his system, which is the low end of its therapeutic-use range (100–1500 ng/mL). No trace of any other drug was found in his system.

== Victims ==
Eight people were killed by Hawkins during the shooting. Six were employees at the Von Maur store and the other two were customers. They are:

- Beverly Jean Flynn, 47 (employee)
- Janet D. Jorgensen, 66 (employee)
- Gary Michael Joy, 56 (employee)
- John Vincent McDonald, 65 (customer)
- Gary Eugene Scharf, 48 (customer)
- Angella Colette Schuster, 36 (department manager)
- Dianne Marie Trent, 53 (employee)
- Maggie Laine Webb, 24 (store manager)

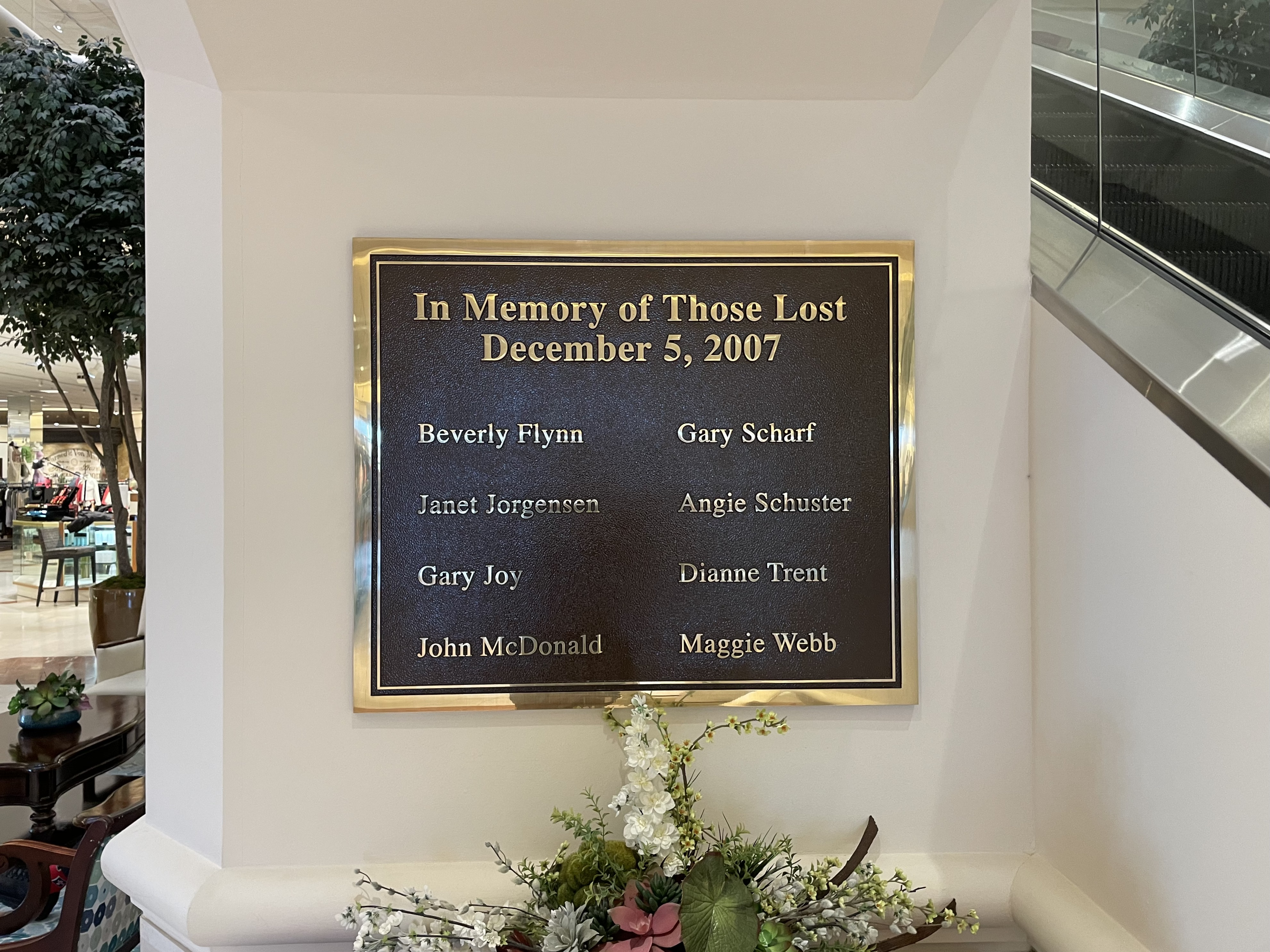
Memorial plaque in the Von Maur department store at the Westroads Mall

Four of the victims shot by Hawkins survived. Two critically injured were store employees. Fred Wilson, 61, was a manager for the customer service department. He was sent to the University of Nebraska Medical Center with a gunshot wound to the upper chest. By the time he reached the ER, he had lost three-quarters of his blood and had no pulse. Wilson was upgraded to stable by the following weekend, and soon after was making some attempts to communicate. The other critically wounded victim was customer service employee Micheale "Mickey" Oldham, 65, who was sent to Creighton University Medical Center. She sustained heavy injuries to the abdomen and back, and she suffered the worst injuries among the surviving victims.

Another surviving victim was customer Jeff Schaffart, 34, who was treated and released at UNMC for a gunshot wound to the left arm and the little finger of his left hand. The Omaha Police Department announced on December 22, 2007, that Mandy Hyda, 34, received a bruise when a bullet fragment struck her left leg. She was neither transported nor treated for the injury. It was initially reported that there were five people injured (not including Hyda), but two of those at the scene who were sent to local hospitals were sent for reasons other than being shot by Hawkins.

== Perpetrator ==
Robert Arthur Hawkins (May 17, 1988 – December 5, 2007) was born at the RAF Lakenheath station in Suffolk, England, U.K., to American U.S. Air Force personnel parents Ronald Hawkins and Maribel "Molly" Rodriguez. He was hospitalized at the age of four after persistent violent behavior in pre-school. He was diagnosed with attention-deficit disorder and posttraumatic stress disorder due to his chaotic homelife. The day after he turned 14, he was sent to a mental health treatment center for threatening to kill his stepmother. Four months later, he became a ward of the State of Nebraska, which lasted nearly four years until he was discharged completely, due to his unwillingness to improve.

During his second hospitalization, he was diagnosed with an unspecified mood disorder and oppositional defiant disorder. His treatments cost the state $265,000. He was expelled from Fort Calhoun High School after trying to sell drugs to his classmates in 2005. He then attended Papillion-La Vista High School, and later dropped out in March 2006. He received a GED. In late 2006, he became estranged from his parents and chose to live with two friends and their mother in a home in the Quail Creek Neighborhood of Bellevue, a suburb 10 miles (16 km) south of Omaha. Debora Maruca-Kovac, the owner of the house in which Hawkins lived, described him as "troubled." She also stated that he was depressed over having been fired from his job at McDonald's, reportedly for stealing $17, and over separating from his girlfriend two weeks prior to the incident because he cheated on her. In the summer of 2007, Hawkins tried to enlist in the U.S. Army but was turned down on account of his mental health record.

Hawkins was ticketed on November 24, 2007, for suspicion of contributing to the delinquency of a minor and two alcohol charges, one of which was for underage possession of alcohol. He was due in court for an arraignment on December 19, 2007. In late November 2007, Hawkins threatened to kill a local teenager's family and burn her house down because he thought she had stolen his CD player. The teen decided to press no charges because Hawkins was known for "shooting his mouth off". As a juvenile, Hawkins was also convicted of a felony drug charge while in foster care in Omaha.

== Aftermath ==
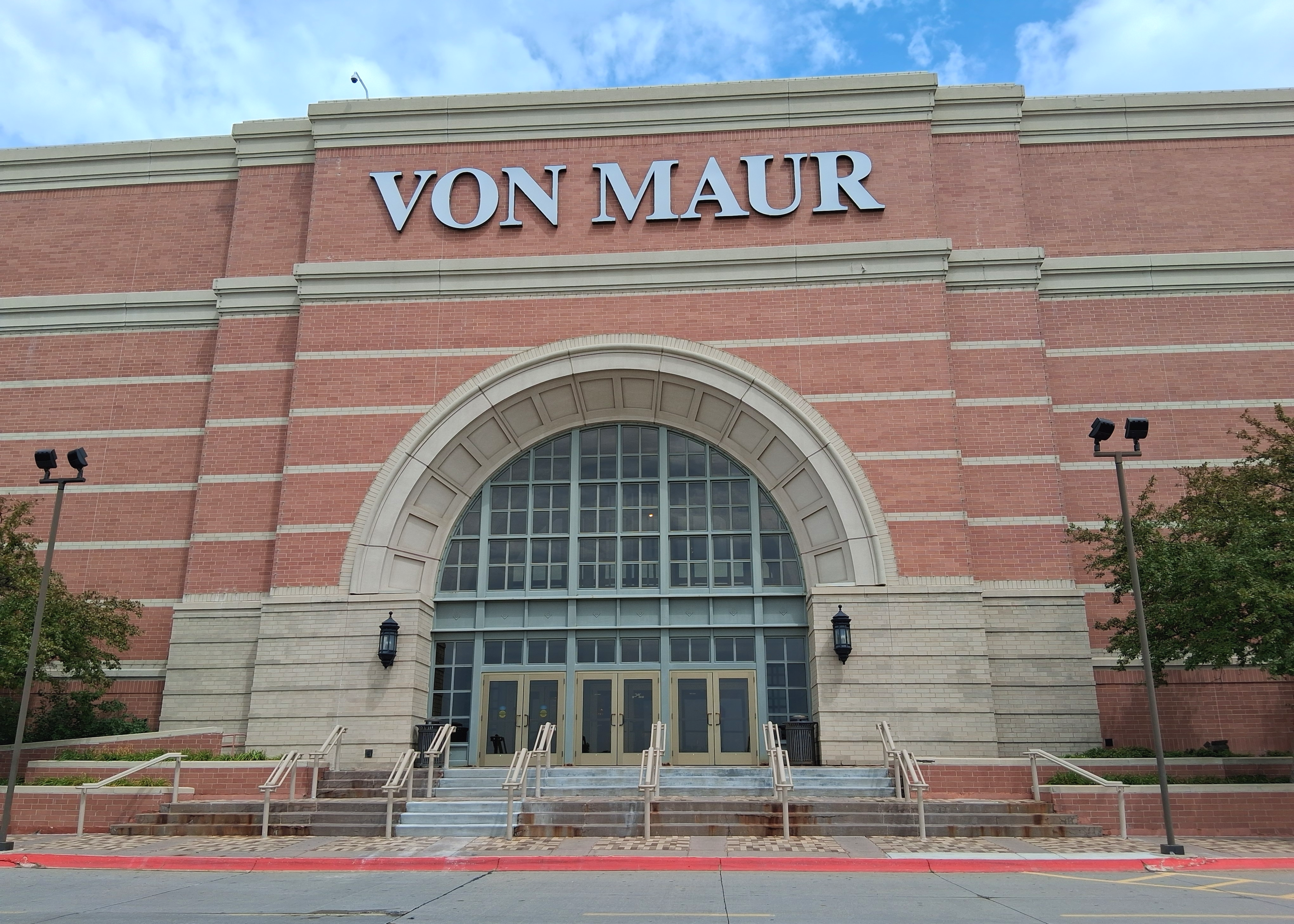
The Von Maur at the Westroads Mall in 2026

In the days following the tragedy, the Von Maur store was thronged on all sides by flowers and signs expressing condolences, and makeshift memorials to the victims. By January 12, 2008, a fund for the victims' families surpassed one million dollars.

The Smoking Gun released a copy of Hawkins' three-page suicide note, which included a note to his family, one to his friends, and his last will and testament, below which he signed his name and included his Social Security number. Initial news reports indicated that Hawkins wrote, "I'm going out in style"; however, the phrase does not appear on the publicly released document.

On January 7, 2009, Hawkins' mother Maribel Rodriguez was featured on season 7 episode 77 of Dr. Phil. Hawkins was the subject of the series premiere of the Investigation Discovery series Evil Lives Here, a show that features testimonials of the loved ones of murderers, which premiered on January 17, 2016. It was his father and ex-stepmother's first public interview since the shooting.

Dutch DJ and producer Angerfist sampled an excerpt from a news story about the shooting on his track "The Road to Fame" on the Retaliate album, released in 2011.

Omaha political punk band Desaparecidos wrote a song about the shooting, "Von Maur Massacre," on their 2015 album Payola.

== Reactions ==
The Von Maur corporate headquarters in Davenport, Iowa, issued a statement saying, "We are deeply saddened by the horrific shooting at our Omaha store this afternoon. Our thoughts and prayers are with the victims of this tragic event, as well as their families." A similar statement was shown on its website's home page. Westroads Mall also stated on its website, "Our thoughts and prayers remain with all affected by this tragedy." Its home page also indicated that the mall would remain closed until the following Saturday, December 8; however, the Von Maur store, where the incident took place, did not open until December 20. The day after the shooting, the Hawkins family released a statement expressing their condolences for the victims. On December 13, 2007, Hawkins' mother, Maribel Rodriguez, issued a formal apology for Hawkins' actions in an interview on Good Morning America.

== See also ==
- List of rampage killers in the United States
- 2016 Munich shooting
- Cascade Mall shooting
- St. Cloud, Minnesota mall stabbing
- 2007 Colorado YWAM and New Life shootings
