= Phillip R. Bennett =

British businessman

- Born: Phillip Roger Bennett; 1948 (age 77–78)
- Education: Cambridge University
- Employer: Refco
- Known for: Accounting fraud

Phillip Roger Bennett (born 1948) is the former CEO of Refco, Inc. He is a British citizen who was educated at Cambridge University. In the 1970s, he worked for Chase Manhattan Bank. He joined Refco in 1981 and became the firm's chief financial officer in 1983. In 1998, chief executive officer Thomas Dittmer retired and Bennett took the job.

== Refco scandal ==
On October 10, 2005, it was revealed that Bennett had hidden roughly $430 million of bad debt from the company's auditors and investors. On October 12, he was charged with and arrested for securities fraud. Shares in Refco then proceeded to drop from $28 per share to $0.08 per share, before being halted and then delisted from the NYSE. Confidence among the brokerage's customer base evaporated and Refco was bankrupt within seven days of the scandal breaking.

Bennett had been buying bad debts from Refco in order to prevent the company from needing to write them off, and was paying for the bad loans with money borrowed by Refco itself. Between 2002 and 2005, he arranged at the end of every quarter for a Refco subsidiary to lend money to a hedge fund called Liberty Corner Capital Strategy, which then lent the money to Refco Group Holdings, Inc (a company he controlled and owned).

Liberty Corner then paid the money back to Refco, leaving Liberty Corner as the apparent borrower when financial statements were prepared. Upon their maturity—timed to occur after the end of Refco's reporting period—the loans were "unwound" (supposedly without the knowledge of Refco's auditors). This meant that Refco Group Holdings. Inc. was put back in the position of owing the same amount of debt to Refco that it owed before it borrowed the money from Liberty Corner. Thus on paper, these debts remained hidden from one quarter to another.

Bennett, a former resident of Gladstone, New Jersey, was sentenced in 2008 to 16 years in jail for the financial fraud. Bennett was given early release on 26 May 2020 on compassionate grounds due to health concerns during the Covid crisis at the age of 71. He was immediately deported to the UK.

== Sources ==
- "Bennett's Refco Scheme Exposed by Late-Night Hunch: 'It Hit Me'", Bloomberg News, October 27, 2005
