= Refco =

Financial services company in New York

Refco, Inc.
- Type: Public company
- Industry: Financial services
- Founded: 1969; 57 years ago
- Defunct: October 17, 2005; 21 years ago
- Fate: Bankruptcy after accounting fraud
- Headquarters: New York City, United States
- Key people: Phillip R. Bennett, CEO & Chairman

Refco was a New York City-based financial services company, primarily known as a broker of commodities and futures contracts. It was founded in 1969 by Raymond Earl Friedman as Ray E. Friedman and Co. Prior to its collapse in October 2005, the firm had over $4 billion in approximately 200,000 customer accounts, and it was the largest broker on the Chicago Mercantile Exchange. The firm's balance sheet at the time of the collapse showed about $75 billion in assets and a roughly equal amount in liabilities.

Refco became a public company on August 11, 2005, with the sale of 26.5 million shares to the public at $22. It closed the day over 25% higher than that, valuing the entire company at about $3.5 billion. Investors had been attracted to Refco's history of profit growth—it had reported 33% average annual gains in earnings over the four years prior to its initial public offering.

== The scandal ==
Refco Inc. entered crisis on Monday, October 10, 2005, when it announced that its chief executive officer and chairman, Phillip R. Bennett had hidden $430 million in bad debts from the company's auditors and investors, and had agreed to take a leave of absence.

Refco said that through an internal review over the preceding weekend it discovered a receivable owed to the company by an unnamed entity that turned out to be controlled by Bennett, in the amount of approximately US$430 million. Apparently, Bennett had been buying bad debts from Refco in order to prevent the company from needing to write them off, and was paying for the bad loans with money borrowed by Refco itself. Between 2002 and 2005, he arranged at the end of every quarter for a Refco subsidiary to lend money to a hedge fund called Liberty Corner Capital Strategy, which then lent the money to Refco Group Holdings, an independent offshore company secretly owned by Phillip Bennett with no legal or official connection to Refco. Bennett's company then paid the money back to Refco, leaving Liberty as the apparent borrower when financial statements were prepared.

In April 2006, papers filed by creditors of Refco seemed to show that Bennett had run a similar scam going back at least to 2000, using Bawag P.S.K. Group in the place of Liberty Corner Capital Strategy.

The law requires that such financial connections between corporation and its own top officers be shown as what is known as a related party transaction in various financial statements. As a result, Refco said, "its financial statements, as of, and for the periods ended, Feb. 28, 2002, Feb. 28, 2003, Feb. 28, 2004, Feb. 28, 2005, and May 31, 2005, taken as a whole, for each of Refco Inc., Refco Group Ltd. LLC and Refco Finance Inc. should no longer be relied upon."

This announcement triggered a number of investigations, and on October 12 Bennett was arrested and charged with one count of securities fraud for using U.S. mail, interstate commerce, and securities exchanges to lie to investors. On October 19, trading of Refco's shares was halted on the New York Stock Exchange, which later delisted the company. Before the halt, Refco shares were trading for more than $28 per share, and as of October 19, they had dropped (on the pink sheets) to $0.80 per share.

Refco, Inc. filed for Chapter 11 for a number of its businesses, to seek protection from its creditors on Monday, October 17, 2005. At the time, it declared assets of around $49 billion, which would have made it the fourth largest bankruptcy filing in American history. However, the company subsequently submitted a revised document, claiming it had $16.5 billion in assets and $16.8 billion in liabilities. Refco also announced a tentative agreement to sell its regulated futures and commodities business, which is not covered by the bankruptcy filing, to a group led by J.C. Flowers & Co. for about $768 million. However, other bidders soon emerged, including Interactive Brokers and Dubai Investments, the investment division of the emirate of Dubai. These offers were for a time rebuffed, as the Flowers-led group had a right to a break-up fee if Refco had sold this business to anyone else. Carlos Abadi, involved in the Dubai bid, said that the Dubai-led group offered $1 billion for all of Refco and was rejected. However, the bankruptcy judge in charge of the case deemed the break-up fee unjustified, and the Flowers group withdrew its bid. The business was instead sold to Man Financial on November 10. Man Financial kept the majority of the Refco futures businesses after selling Refco Overseas Ltd (Refco's European operation) to Marathon Asset Management who then relaunched the business as Marex Financial Limited.

On October 27, 2005, shareholders of Refco filed class-action lawsuits against Refco, Thomas H. Lee Partners, Grant Thornton, Credit Suisse First Boston, and Goldman Sachs. On March 2, 2006, a lawyer representing Refco's unsecured creditors began steps to sue the IPO underwriters for aiding and abetting the fraud, or for breach of fiduciary duty. In April 2006, creditors sued Bawag P.S.K. Group for more than $1.3 billion.

In April 2006, Christie's auction house sold Refco's prized art collection, which included photographs by Charles Ray and Andy Warhol.

On February 15, 2008, Phillip R. Bennett pleaded guilty to 20 charges of securities fraud and other criminal charges. On July 3, 2008, Bennett was sentenced to 16 years in federal prison.

== The $430 million in bad debts ==
The apparent fraud was caught by Peter James, Refco's newly hired controller. Apparently, in the fiscal quarter before the story broke, Bennett failed to execute his temporary Liberty Strategies-hidden repayment of debt. This left the position on the books for James to find. It is unclear why the firm's chief financial officer had not spotted the loan, but the firm's previous CFO, Robert Trosten, left Refco in October, 2004 with a $45 million payout that was not disclosed in the firm's IPO prospectus. He was under investigation by regulators, who suspected he may have known something about Bennett's malfeasance. Robert C. Trosten pleaded guilty to five charges in 2008. Tone N. Grant, a Refco official, was convicted of 5 charges on April 17, 2008. He was sentenced to 10 years on August 8, 2008.

== $525 million in fake bonds ==
On March 15, 2006, information leaked by the U.S. prosecutor's office revealed that Refco held offshore accounts holding as much as $525 million in fake bonds. The company held the "securities" for Bawag P.S.K., the Austrian bank with which Refco had a close relationship, discussed in part above, and for a non-U.S. hedge fund called Liquid Opportunity. Apparently, Bawag and Liquid Opportunity jointly owned six Anguilla companies, which in turn owned the fake bonds. Refco's attorneys have declined to comment.

== Older scandals ==
Refco had not enjoyed a clean reputation with regulators. The Commodity Futures Trading Commission and the National Futures Association took action against Refco and its units more than 100 times since the firm's founding. According to The Wall Street Journal, it was "among the most cited brokers in the business, according to data provided by the NFA."

In 2001, the NFA ordered Refco to pay $43 million to 13 investors after their Refco broker used bogus order tickets to clear trades.

On May 16, 2005, the company disclosed that it had received a "Wells notice", indicating it might face charges related to improper short selling at its Refco Securities unit and other matters. The company had been implicated in naked short sales on the stock of a company called Sedona Corp., disclosed that it was negotiating with the SEC and hoped to reach a settlement that would likely include an injunction against future violations and "payment of a substantial civil penalty." Refco put $5 million in reserve in anticipation of the settlement. The company has also been sued by Sedona in connection with this trading.
