= THL Partners =

American private equity firm

- Type: Private
- Industry: Private equity
- Founded: 1974; 52 years ago
- Founder: Thomas H. Lee
- Headquarters: 100 Federal Street; Boston, Massachusetts, United States
- Products: Leveraged buyout, growth capital
- AUM: $21.4 billion (2026)
- Number of employees: 150 (2026)
- Website: thl.com

THL Partners is an American private equity firm headquartered in Boston. The firm invests in middle market growth companies across various sectors, including financial technology, services, healthcare, technology, and business.

== History ==
The company was founded in 1974 by Thomas H. Lee. As of 2022, THL had raised approximately $34 billion of equity capital, investing in more than 160 companies. The firm's portfolio includes over 500 add-on acquisitions representing an aggregate enterprise value at acquisition of over $210 billion. In 2022, Private Equity International ranked THL Partners 82nd among the top 300 private equity firms based on funds raised in 2021.

The firm's Management Committee consists of Chairman Tony DiNovi, and Managing Director Tom Hagerty. The firm's namesake, Thomas H. Lee, left the company and formed Lee Equity Partners in 2006.

== Investments ==
The firm has raised more than $36 billion since inception. Its funds include:

- 1984 - Fund I ($66 million)
- 1989 - Fund II ($568 million)
- 1996 - Fund III ($1.4 billion)
- 1998 - Fund IV ($3.5 billion)
- 2001 - Fund V ($6.1 billion)
- 2006 - Fund VI ($8.1 billion)
- 2016 - Fund VII ($2.6 billion)
- 2019 - Fund VIII ($3.59 billion)
- 2022 - Fund IX ($5.6 billion)

=== Other Funds ===
- 2019 – Continuation Fund I ($867 million)
- 2020 – Continuation Fund II ($916 million)
- 2021 – Automation Fund ($900 million)

Notable transactions sponsored by THL include AbacusNext, Aramark, AutoStore, Brooks Automation, Ceridian, CSafe, Dunkin' Brands, Experian, Fidelity National Information Services, FourKites, Hightower Advisors, HomeSide Lending, Houghton Mifflin, Syneos Health, Michael Foods, The Nielsen Company, Odessa, ProSiebenSat.1, Smile Doctors, Snapple, Warner Chilcott, Warner Music Group, and West Corporation.

== Refco ==
In 2004, THL completed a leveraged buyout acquisition of Refco, a financial services company specializing in commodities and futures contracts, which collapsed suddenly in October 2005 only months after its IPO. Refco's collapse cost investors more than $1 billion and sparked multiple suits for negligence against the firm. THL in turn sued Refco's auditors and former executives claiming they hid the fraud which caused Refco's collapse. THL has since settled all claims by Refco's brokerage customers, bankruptcy trustee and shareholders.

== Art Van Bankruptcy ==
In March 2020, the THL-owned furniture retailer Art Van Furniture filed for Chapter 11 bankruptcy. The company was forced to end its going-out-of-business sales two days after they were approved due to the COVID-19 pandemic in the United States. While Art Van wanted to pay employee wages and health care obligations, the company as a debtor-in-possession could not choose to pay employees at the expense of creditors without a court order. THL subsequently established a 'Hardship Fund' for former employees.

THL seeded the fund with an initial donation of $1 million and also pledged to match up to another $1 million in outside donations. In March 2021, THL funded its full matching commitment, resulting in relief payments of approximately $1,200 per former employee.

== Affiliates ==
THL's past affiliates include:

THL Credit Advisors acquired in 2020 by First Eagle Investment Managed, provided junior debt to middle-market companies seeking capital for growth, acquisition, recapitalization and/or change of control. In July 2020, THL Credit changed its name to First Eagle Alternative Capital BDC, Inc.

TH Lee Putnam Ventures is a technology-focused private equity firm affiliated with THL and Putnam Investments, a leading global money management firm. TH Lee Putnam Ventures manages $1.1 billion in capital commitments and has invested approximately $850 million in more than 43 companies since the firm's formation in 1999.
