= J. L. Brandeis and Sons Store Building =

Historic building in Omaha, Nebraska, U.S.

- U.S. National Register of Historic Places
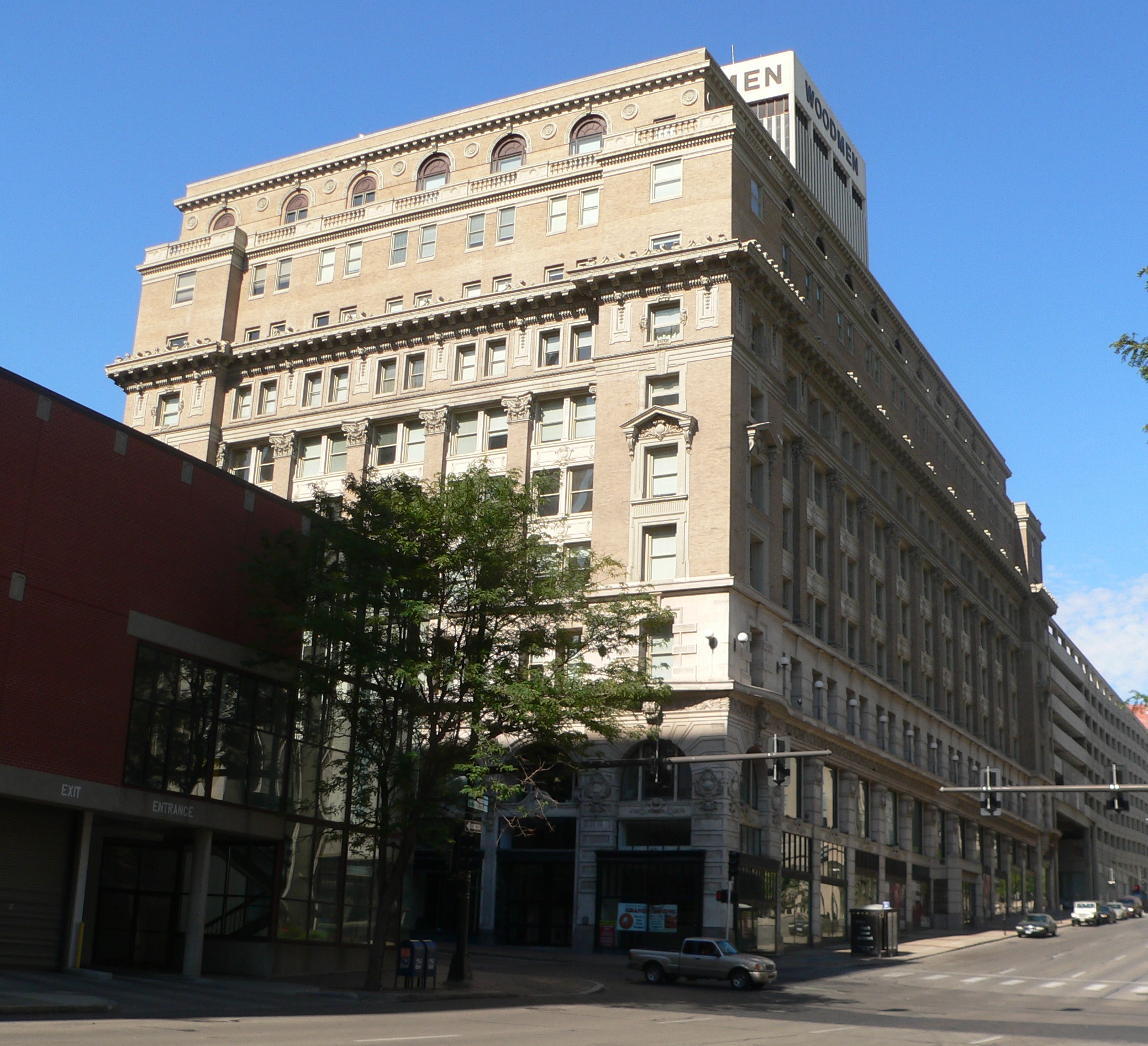
- The Brandeis Building in 2013
- Location: 200 S. 16th St. Omaha, Nebraska, U.S.
- Coordinates: 41.25835187609272°N 95.93780265804055°W
- Built: 1906
- NRHP reference No.: 82000601
- Added to NRHP: October 20, 1982

The J. L. Brandeis and Sons Store Building is located at 210 South 16th Street in the central business district of Omaha, Nebraska, United States. Formerly the headquarters location of the Brandeis Department Store chain, it currently holds apartments and condominiums known as The Brandeis. The building was listed on the National Register of Historic Places in 1982.

== About ==
The original eight stories were constructed in 1906 and were designed by architect John Latenser, Sr. in Neo-Renaissance style. They cost $650,000 to build. Two more stories were later added to the building in 1921. Though the building was listed on the National Register of Historic Places in 1982, it has been through a series of several internal remodeling ventures that have had mixed results. In early 2008, the building was purchased by Townsend Inc, of Overland Park, Kansas, and was converted to a high-end mixed use residential and commercial space. The building was divided into three subdivisions: the lowest floor, "The Pavilion", has area reserved for commercial space, the management offices and security. There is also a refurbished food court with local and national food vendors, flat screen televisions and a fountain. Floors two to seven ("The Renata") are reserved for high-end apartments, with the second floor housing a fitness center and movie theater for building residents. Floors eight and nine ("The Enclave") consist of luxury condominiums that are separate and secure from the apartments. The building also features an on-site concierge and heated underground parking. The tenth floor at the top of the building, originally a gorgeous ballroom, is now converted into one-bedroom apartments.

== Gallery ==
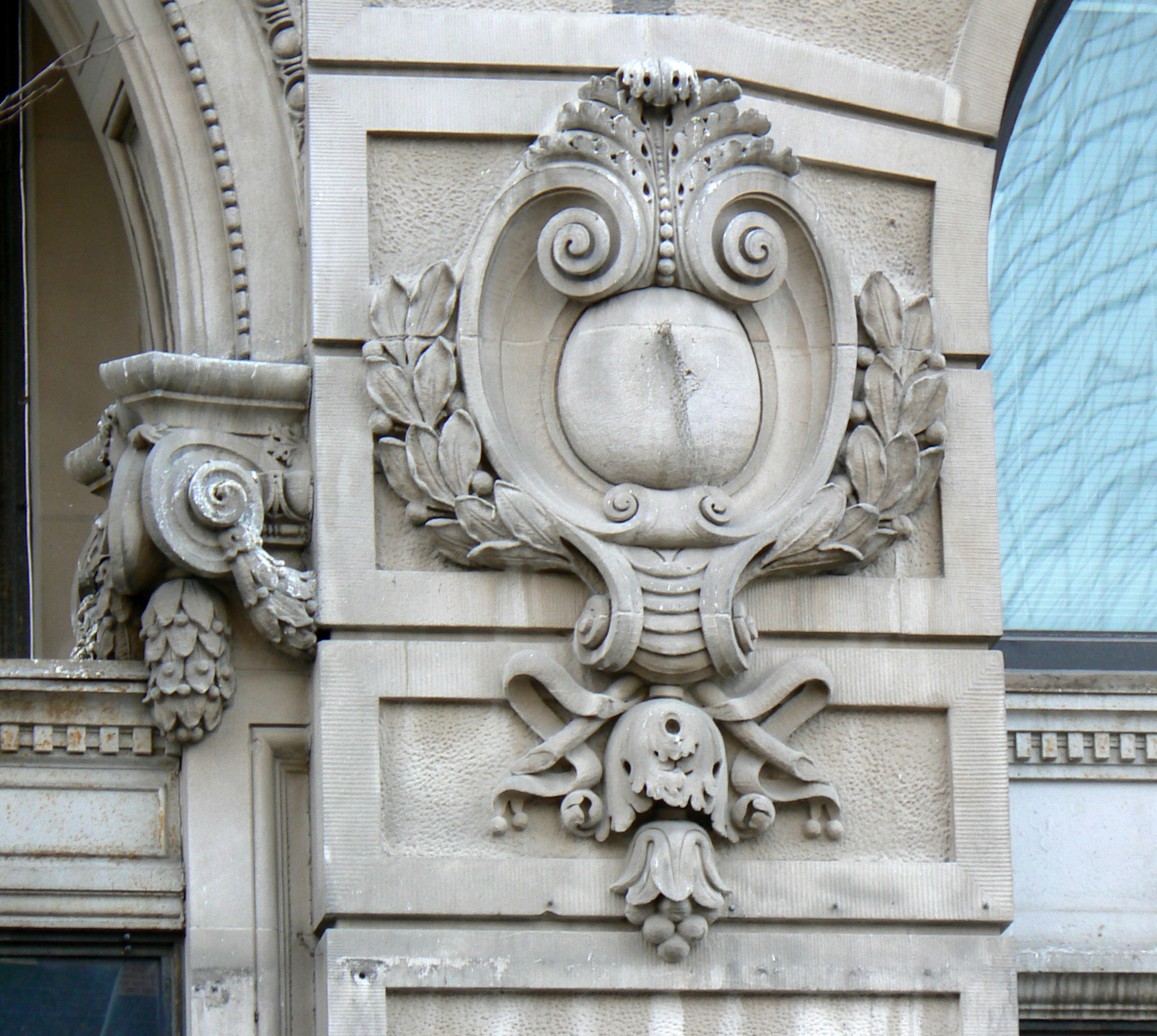
Architectural details on the Brandeis Building

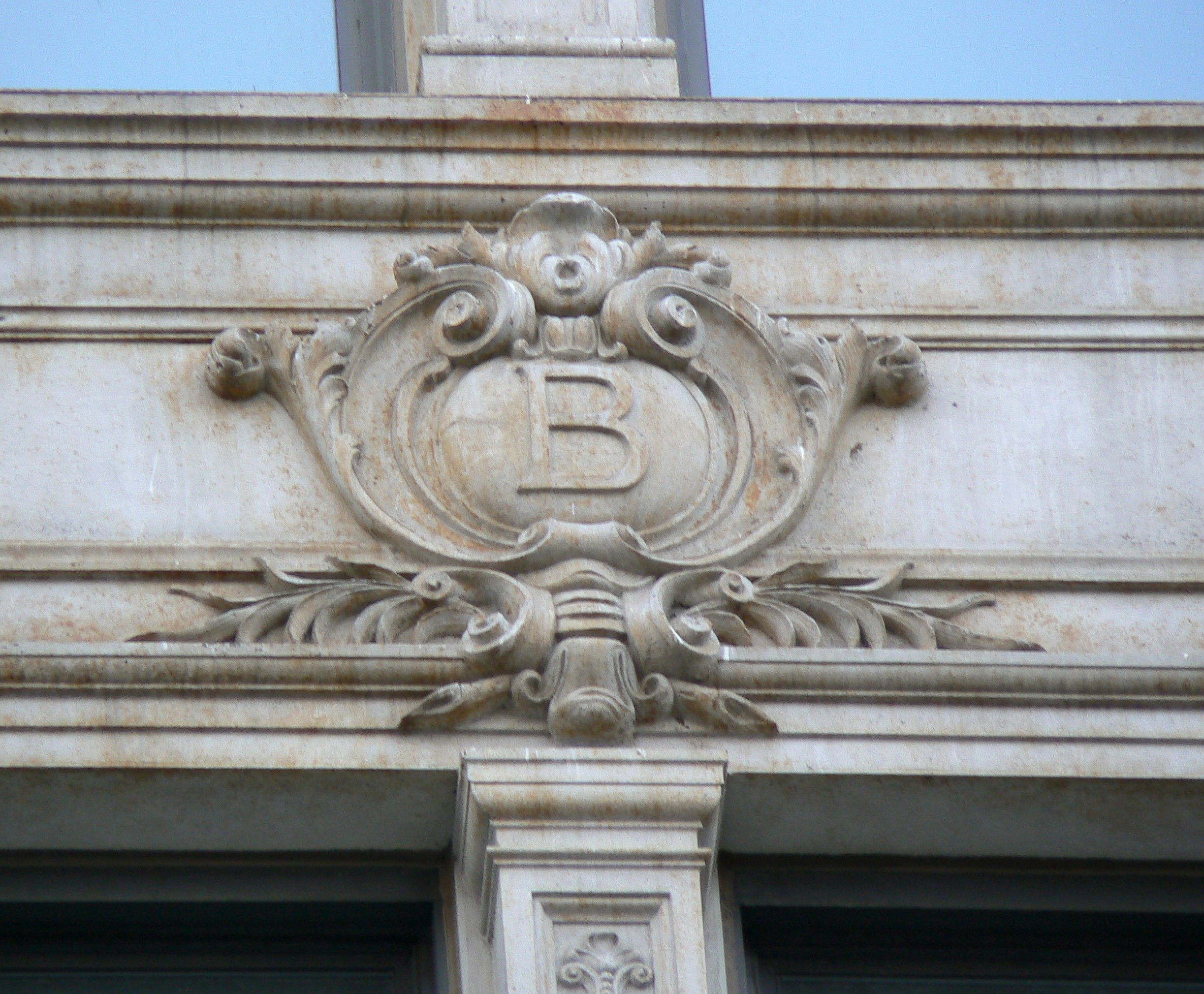
Architectural details on the Brandeis Building

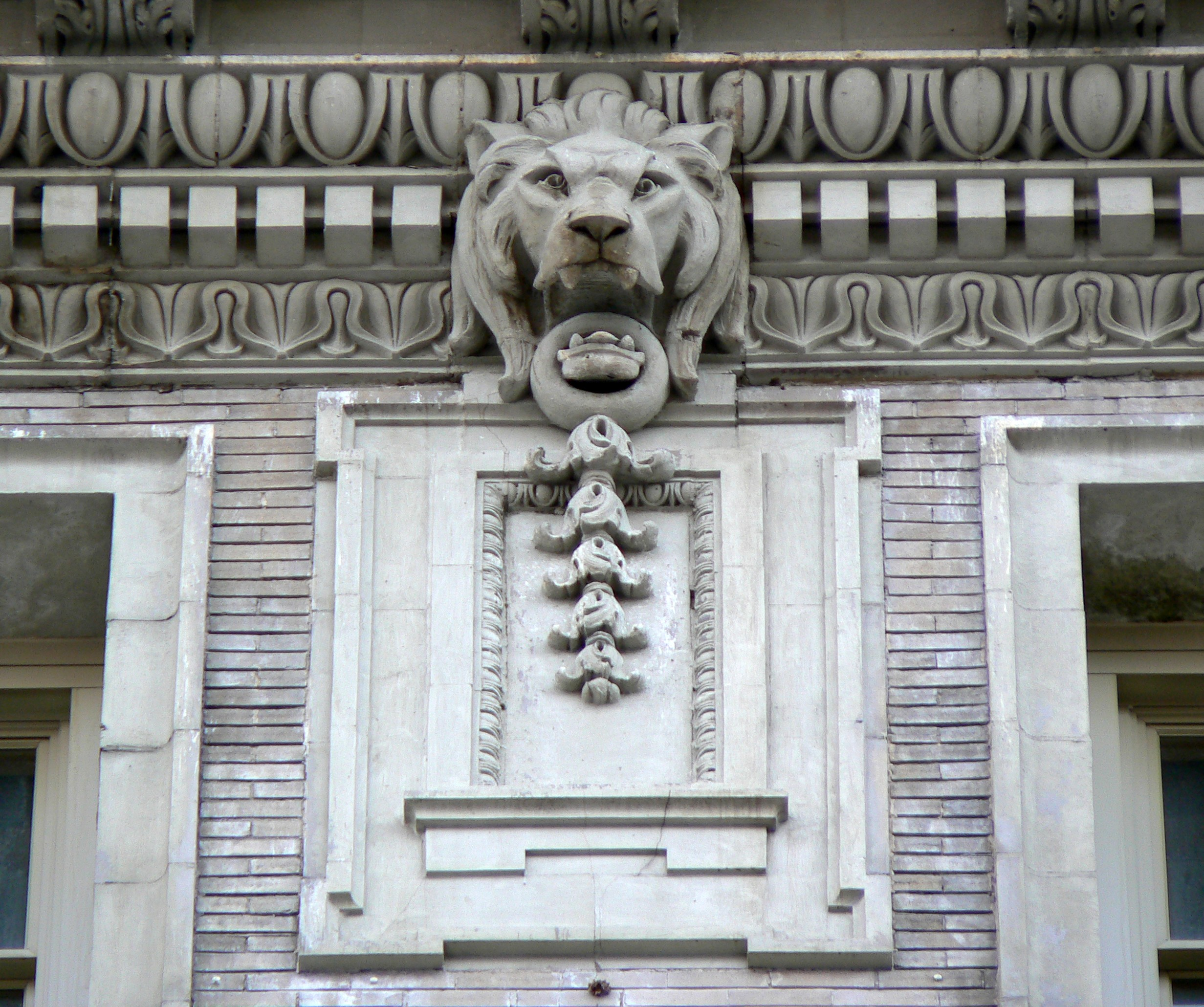
Lions above the seventh floor surround the entire building just below the original roof line.

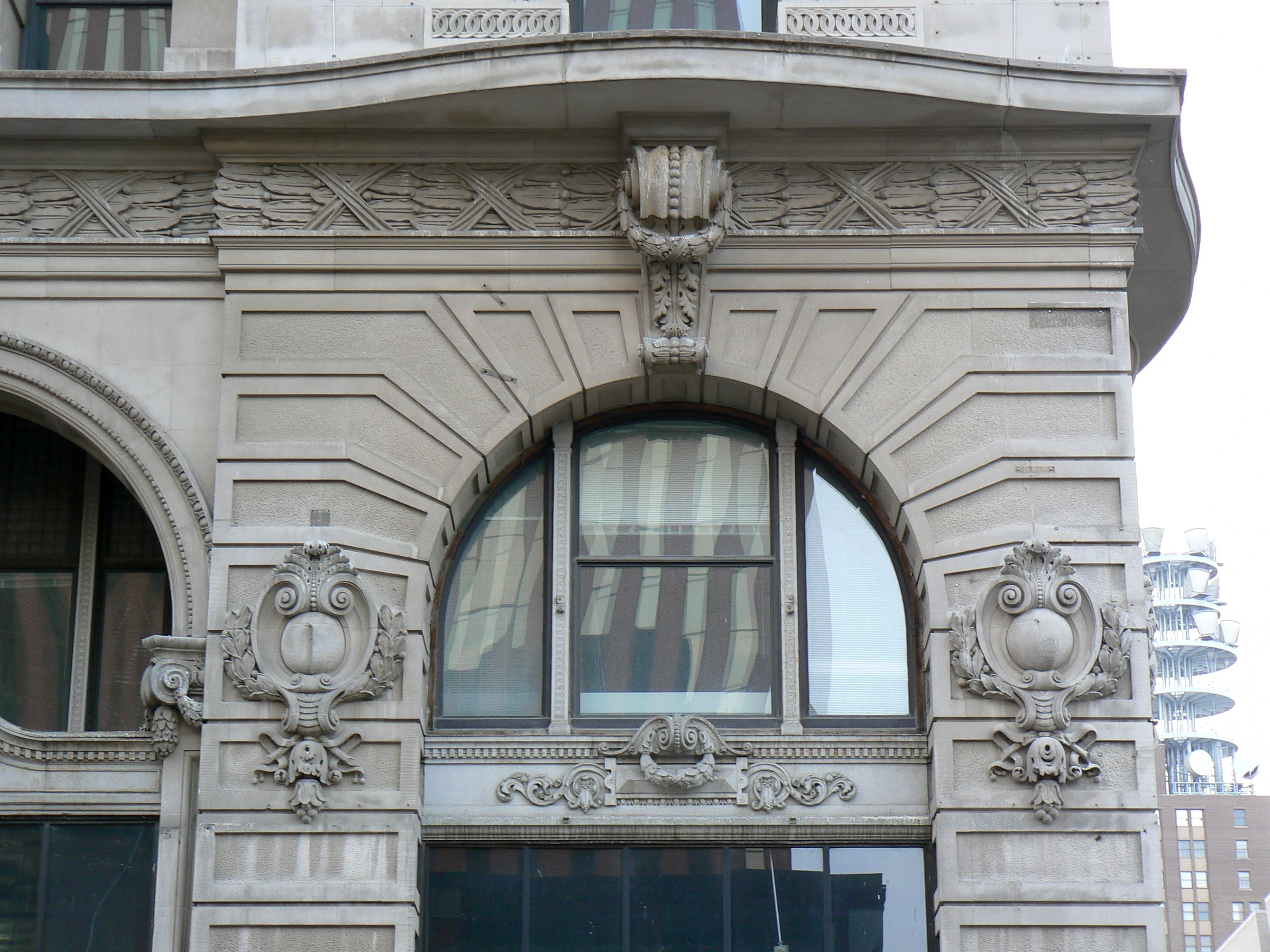
Architectural facade above the second floor, northeast corner of building.

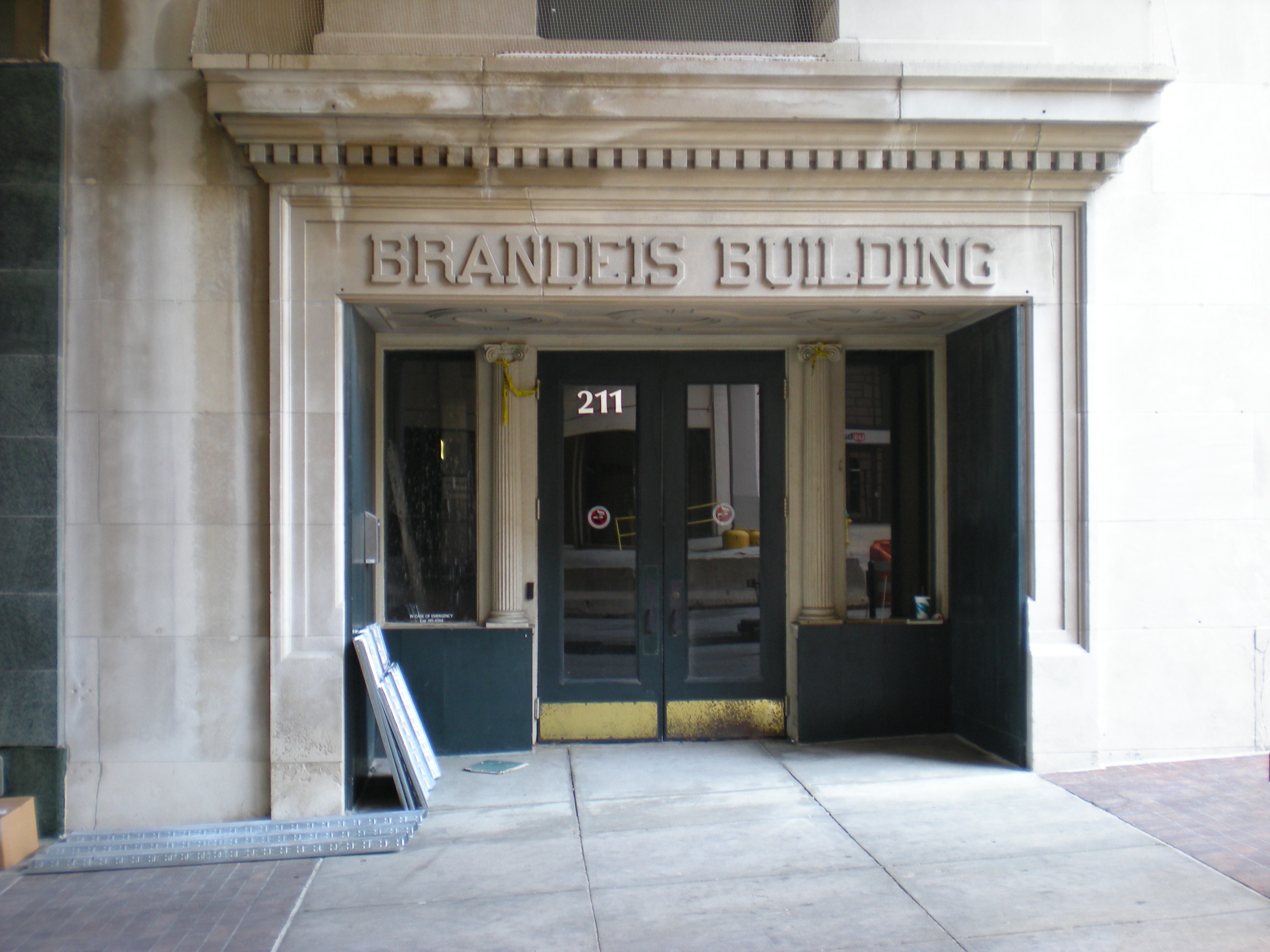
Brandeis 17th Street Entrance

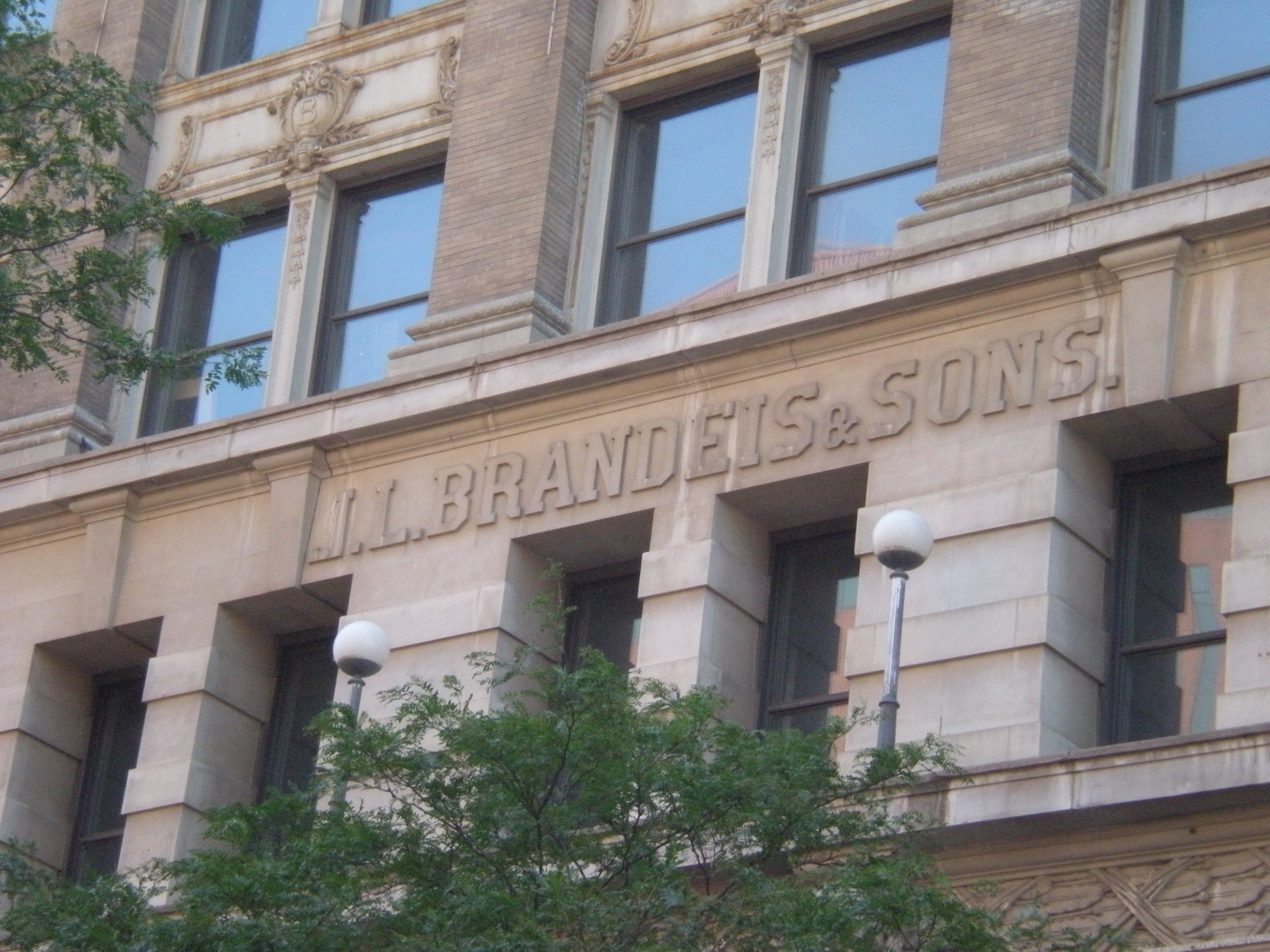
Front of the building; 16th Street

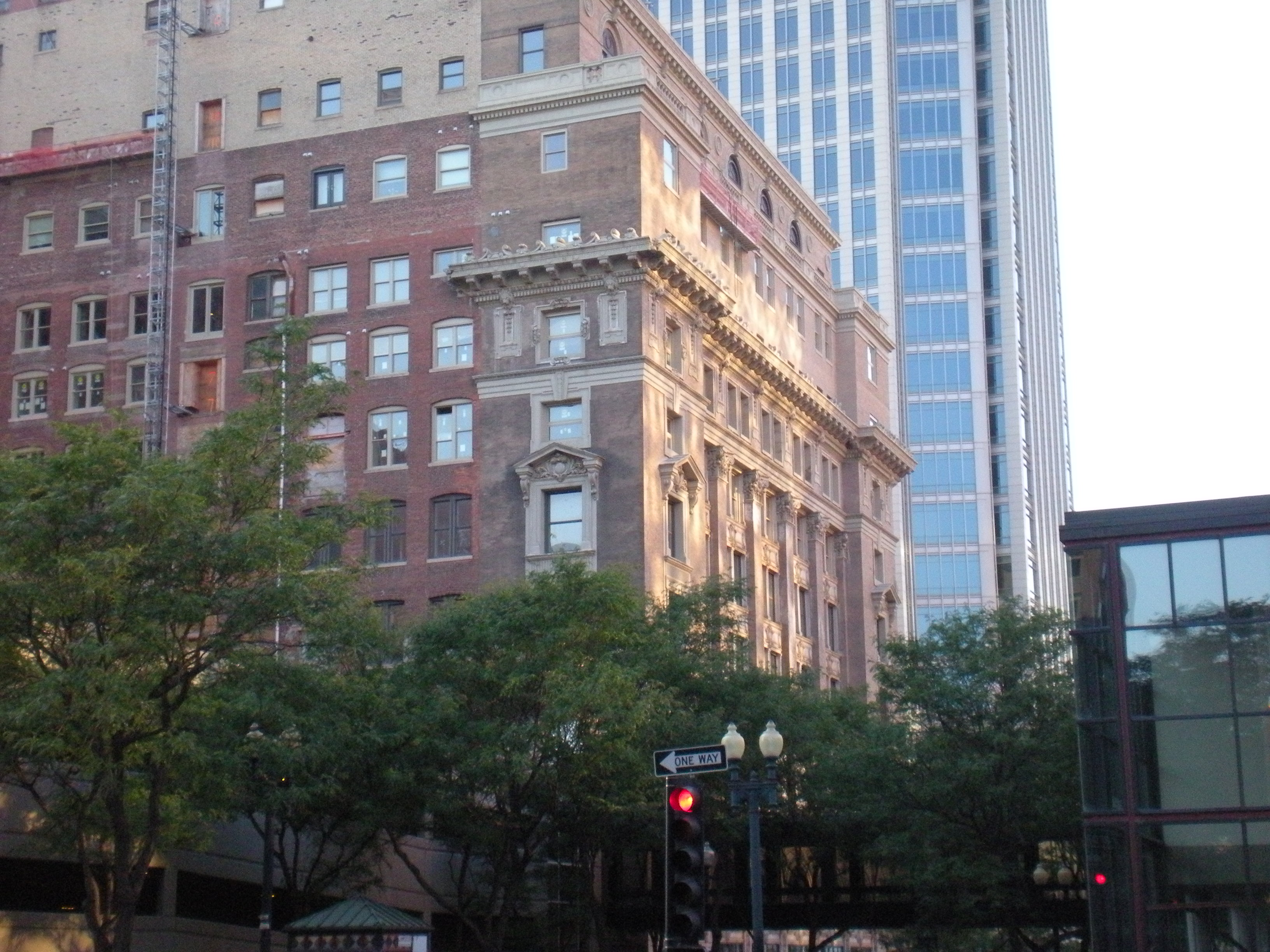
Southwest view of the building from 16th Street during revitalization; July 2008.

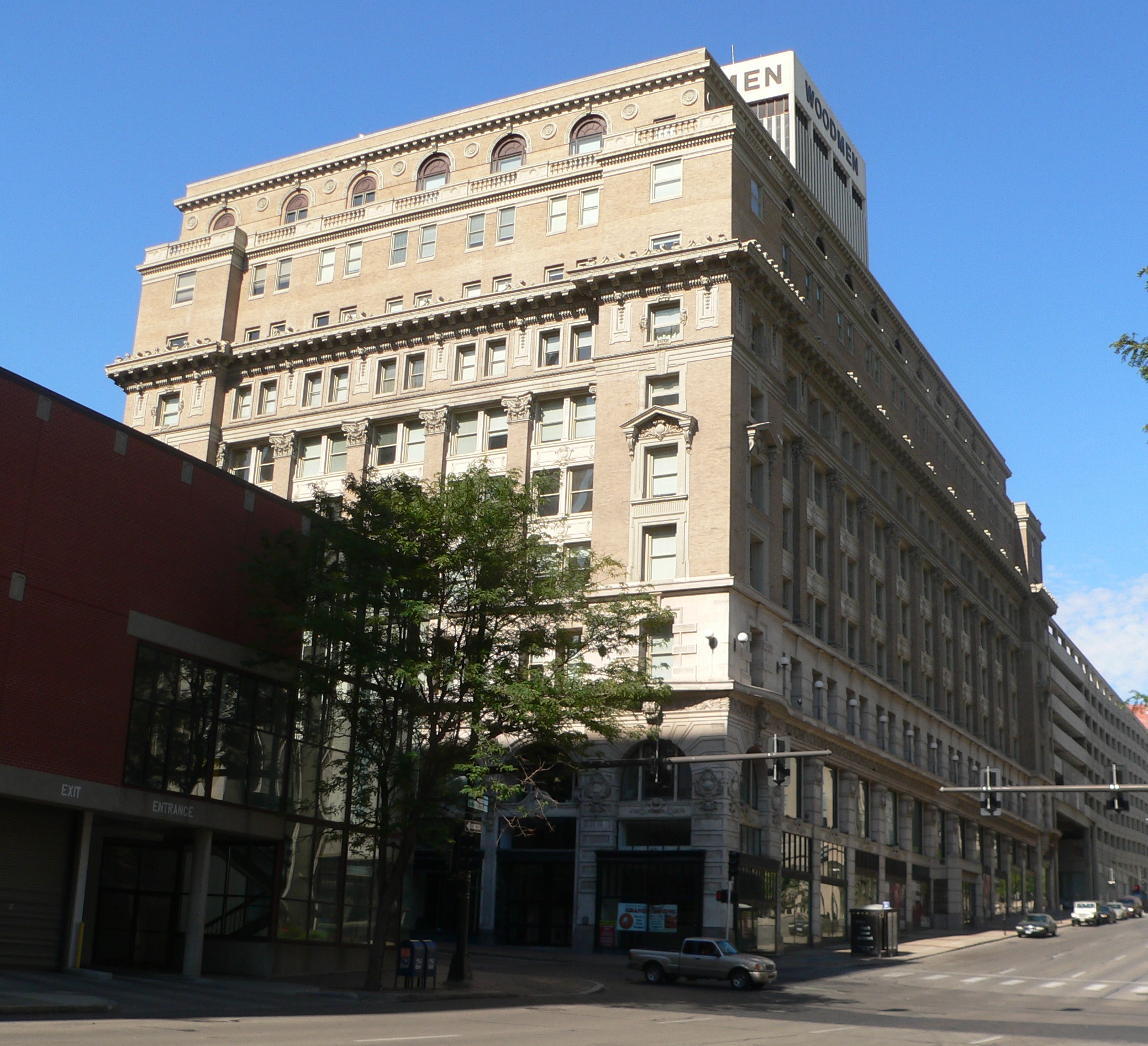
Northeast corner from 16th and Douglas; July 2013.

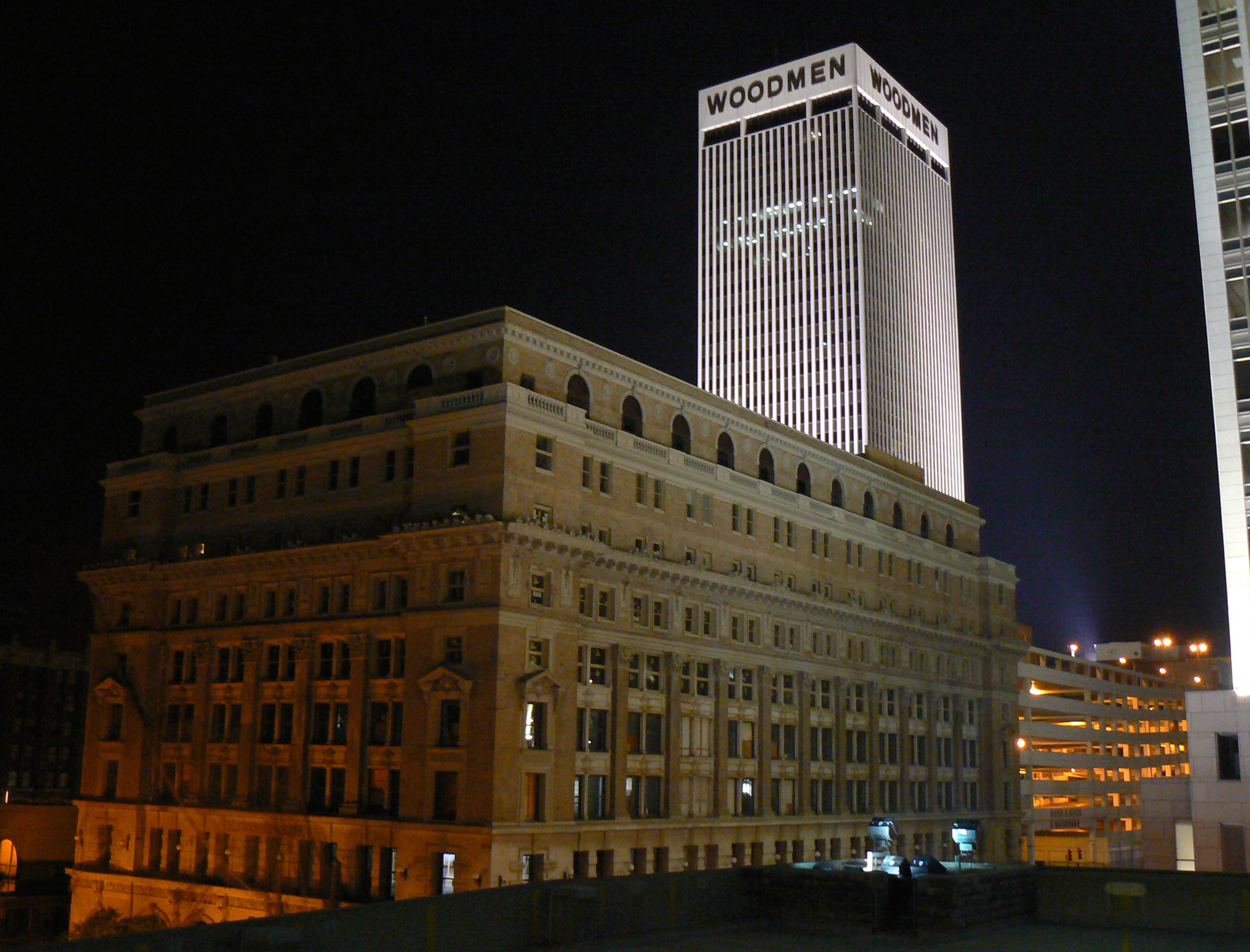
The Brandeis Building in 2007, with the Woodmen Tower to the west.

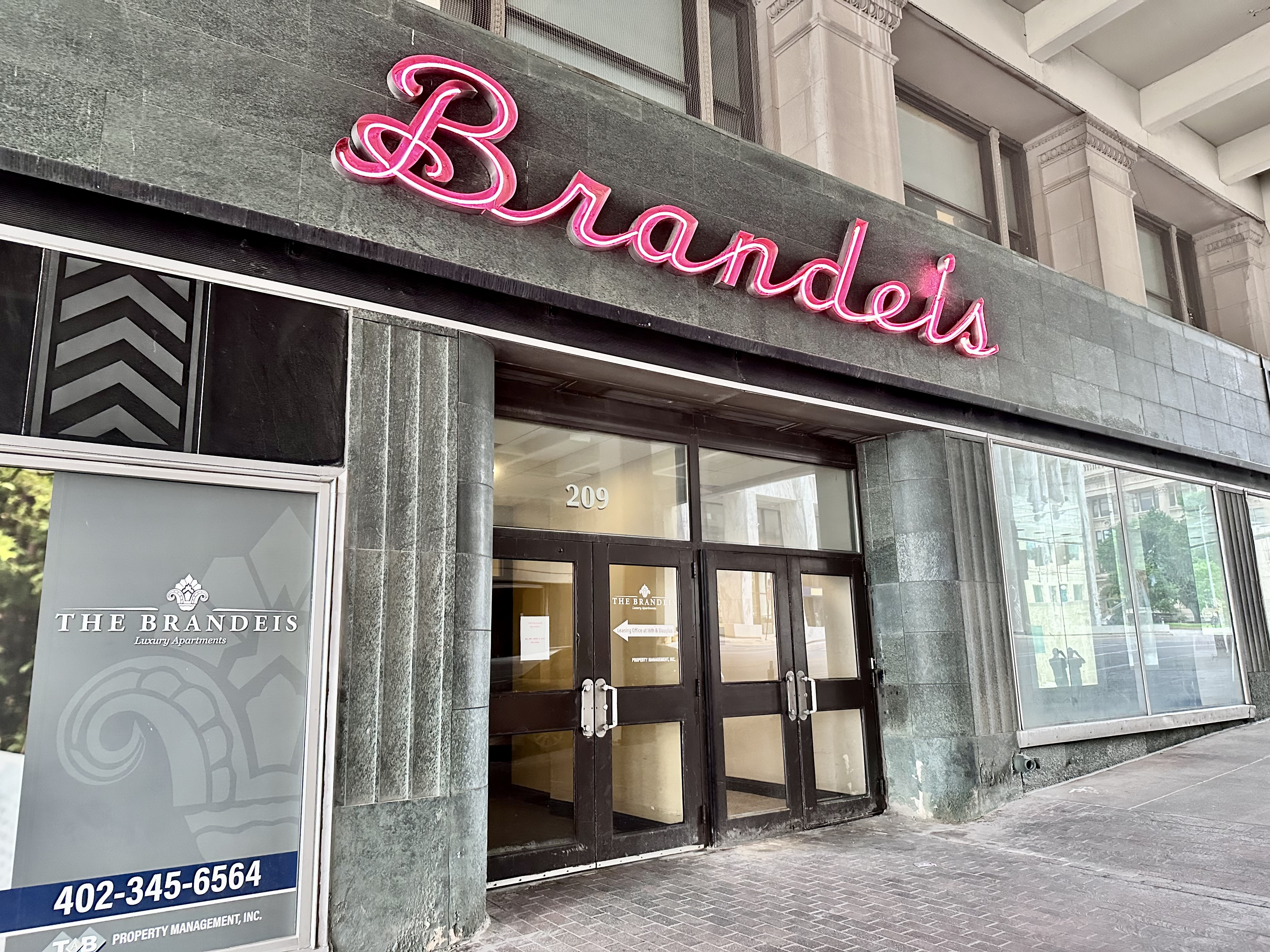
The neon sign on 17th street, still lit in 2025.

== See also ==
- History of Omaha
