= Westroads Mall =

Shopping mall in Omaha, Nebraska, United States

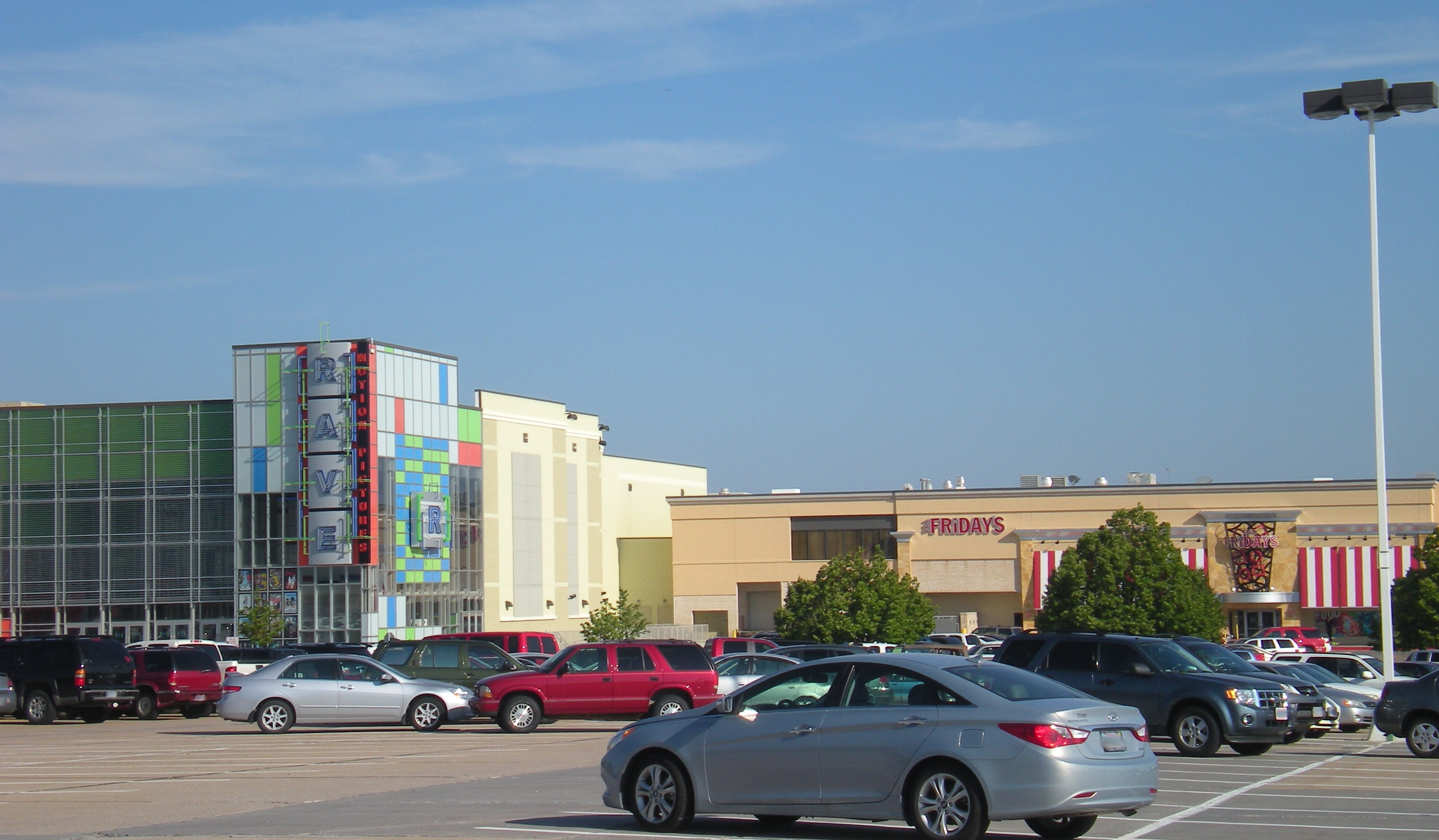
- North side of the Westroads Mall in Omaha, Nebraska, seen 2010. Both the Rave Cinema and TGI Fridays are now closed.
- Location: Omaha, Nebraska
- Coordinates: 41°15′59″N 96°4′6″W
- Opened: 1967; 59 years ago
- Developer: John Wiebe
- Manager: GGP
- Owner: GGP
- Num. of stores: 122
- Num. of anchor tenants: 6
- Floor area: 1,045,782 sq ft (97,156.3 m^{2})
- Floors: 2 with partial basement (1 in AMC Theatres and Dick's Sporting Goods, 3 in Von Maur)
- Parking: 5,106
- Public transit: Metro Transit
- Website: westroadsmall.com

Westroads Mall is an enclosed shopping mall in Omaha, Nebraska at the intersection of 100th and Dodge Streets (U.S. Route 6). It is the largest mall in Nebraska. The mall's anchor stores are The Container Store, Von Maur, JCPenney, Dick's Sporting Goods, Dillard's, and AMC Theatres.

== History ==
Designed by real estate developer John Wiebe, Westroads Mall opened in 1967. Prudential Financial purchased the mall from Wiebe for $45 million in 1977. In 1997, General Growth Properties acquired the mall from Prudential. The mall was owned by both General Growth (51% share) and Canadian property development company Ivanhoe Cambridge (49% share); it was managed by General Growth Properties on behalf of the venture. General Growth Properties acquired the 49% that it didn't previously own on April 5, 2012.

The original anchors were JCPenney, Montgomery Ward and local department store Kilpatrick's, which was owned by Younkers and later took the Younkers name. J. L. Brandeis and Sons added a store a few years later; that location closed in the mid-1980s after Younkers purchased Brandeis, with operations consolidated into the existing Younkers store. A new south wing leading to a new Von Maur store opened in 1995. Montgomery Ward closed in 1997, and was replaced by The Jones Store; when that location closed in 2003, Younkers took over the space. Galyan's opened a junior anchor store in 1997; the company was purchased by Dick's Sporting Goods in 2004.

The mall was renovated several times: in 1990, 1995, 1999 and 2003 and again in 2013–2014, which included the addition of an H&M store and Wi-Fi.

In May 1991, a food court opened; it was replaced in 2015 by Flagship Commons, a food hall concept located elsewhere in the mall and operated by Flagship Restaurant Group. On October 22, 2016, The Container Store opened in the former food court space.

The Cheesecake Factory opened outside the mall on November 1, 2006.

In December 2012, a Forever 21 Super Store opened on the lower level. The lower level formerly housed a family entertainment center, Tilt, with an arcade and indoor miniature golf course.

On January 20, 2018, Abercrombie & Fitch closed at the mall.

In August 2018, the Younkers store closed with the liquidation of its owner, Bon-Ton Stores.

In 2026, Dillard's announced it would move its location at Oak View Mall to Westroads, set to open in Spring 2027.

== Movie theaters ==
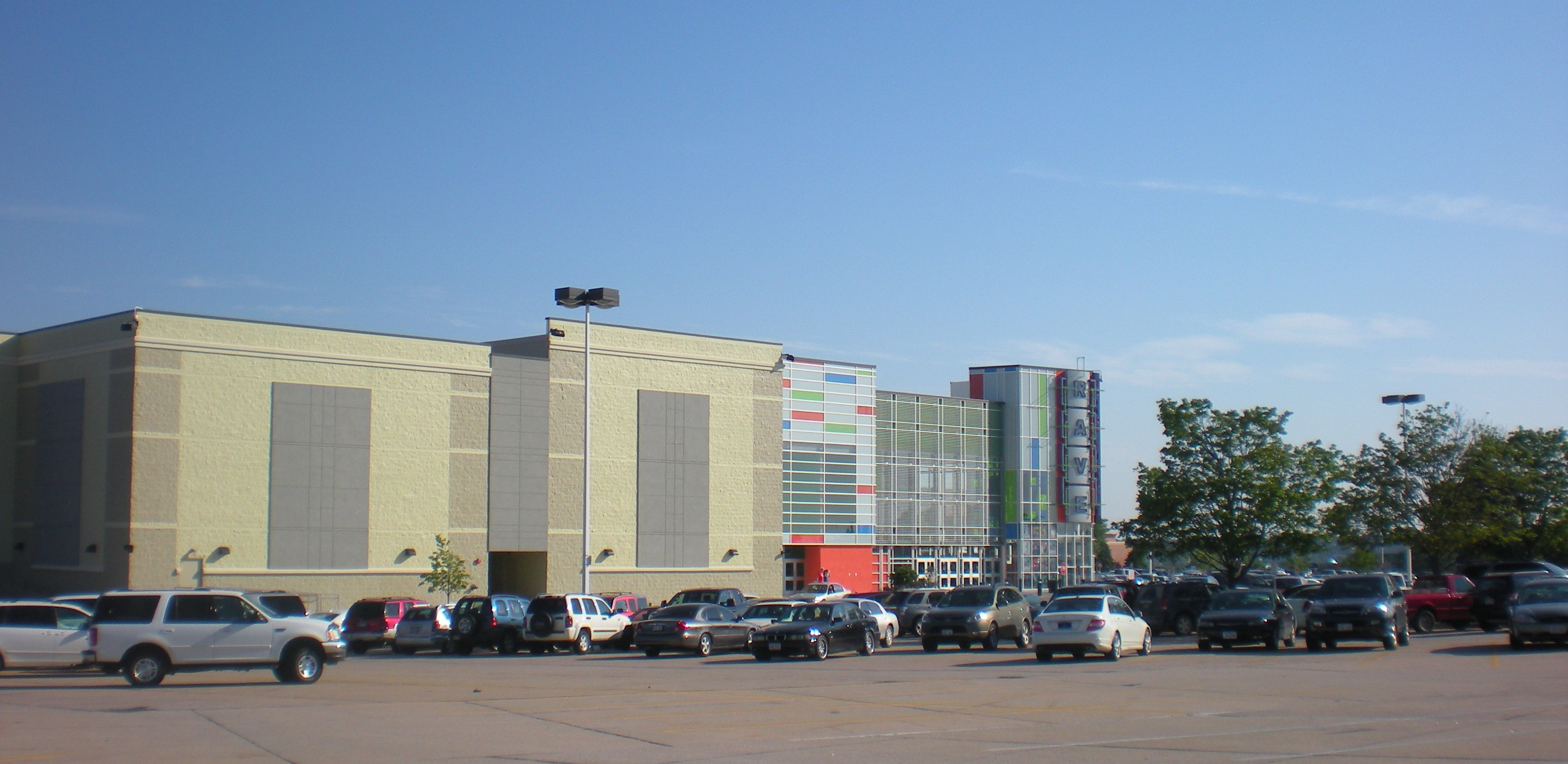
Rave Motion Pictures at Westroads Mall.

The first theater in the mall, the Fox Westroads, opened in November 1967. Originally a single screen theater, it was converted to the dual screen Fox Twin in 1976. In 1969, a second theater, Six West, opened at the mall—reportedly the first six-screen theater complex in the United States. Both theaters were eventually purchased by AMC Theatres and marketed together as the Westroads 8. The theaters closed in 1997.

In November 2008, Rave Motion Pictures opened a new 14-screen digital multiplex on the site of the former Kilpatrick's/Younkers store. It was acquired by AMC Theatres in 2013.

== Shootings ==
Westroads has been the location of one mass shooting in 2007, and two others in 2021 within five weeks of each other. A memorial honoring the victims of the 2007 mass shooting is located within the Von Maur store where it occurred.

=== December 2007 shooting ===
On December 5, 2007, at 1:36 p.m 19-Year Old Robert Hawkins entered the WestRoads Mall via the South entrance of The Von Maur department store, Omaha, Nebraska. Six minutes, later he returned with an WASR-10 Semi Automatic Rifle concealed under his sweatshirt. He then immediately took the elevator to the third floor. Upon exiting the elevator doors he fatally shot two women standing by clothes racks, aimed his gun down the mall's atrium killing two men. He then shot 2 people on the third floor, killing one, then walked into the customer service desk, killing three. Around 1:49 p.m Hawkins died after shooting himself in the chin. The mall reopened on December 8, 2007, with increased security, while Von Maur reopened on December 20, 2007.

=== 2021 shootings ===
On March 12, 2021, 21-year old Kenya Jenkins shot a police officer with a .380 ACP Taurus Armas handgun after being detained by staff and security for shoplifting at the J.C. Penney store. Though no shots were fired in the main mall area or any other store, and Jenkins had fled the property shortly after firing, the mall was placed on lockdown to be cleared by law enforcement. Police pursued Jenkins on a high-speed chase on Interstate 80, apprehending him outside Waverly, Nebraska. The officer survived the shooting. Jenkins pled guilty to assaulting an officer and use of a weapon to commit a felony, and sentenced to 55-75 years in prison in 2024.

On April 17, 2021, two individuals exchanged gunfire on the first floor of the mall near the JCPenney store. Following a confrontation in line at a pretzel stand, 16-year old Makhi Woolridge-Jones drew a handgun and shot 21-year old Trequez Swift twice in the back as he tried to leave. Swift died from these injuries later that day. Swift's companion returned fire, but did not hit anyone. Woolridge-Jones was convicted of second-degree murder and sentenced to a minimum of 35 years in prison in 2022.
