= Deb Shops =

Defunct American retail clothing chain

Deb Shops, Inc.
- Formerly: JOY Hosiery (1932–1972)
- Type: Private
- Industry: Retail (apparel)
- Founded: 1932; 94 years ago (as a retail); 2015; 11 years ago (as an online retailer)
- Founder: Philip Rounick and Aaron Weiner
- Defunct: 2018
- Headquarters: Philadelphia, Pennsylvania, US
- Products: Clothing; Accessories
- Number of employees: 2,600
- Website: debshops.com Archived January 4, 2015, at the Wayback Machine

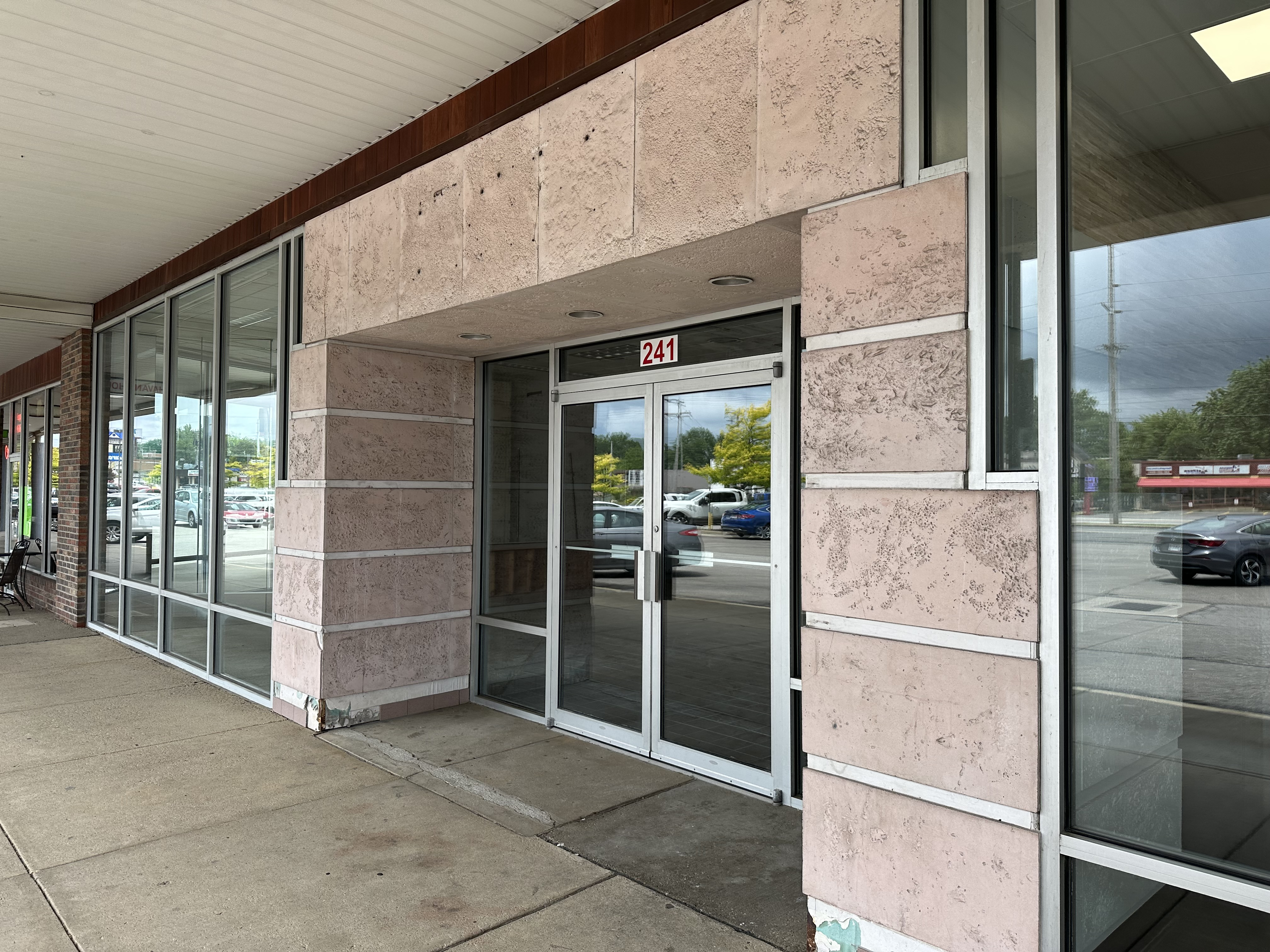
Former DEB Shops, Boardman Plaza, Boardman Ohio. This location closed in the early 2000s, and still has the neon hanging up.

Deb Shops, Inc. was a specialty retail chain store and catalog in the United States, selling women's clothing and accessories under its own private labels, as well as other labels, then exclusively an online retailer. The company was based in Philadelphia and principally served junior and plus-sized women in their early teens through their late twenties. At its peak Deb Shops operated 337 stores across 42 states. Following two bankruptcies in 2015, it became an exclusively plus-size online store.

== History ==
The company was founded by Philip Rounick and Aaron Weiner, who opened their first store under the name JOY Hosiery in Philadelphia in 1932. JOY Hosiery initially sold reasonably priced hosiery, lingerie, and foundations in a wide variety of styles. In 1939, newly available nylon stockings were added to its inventory.

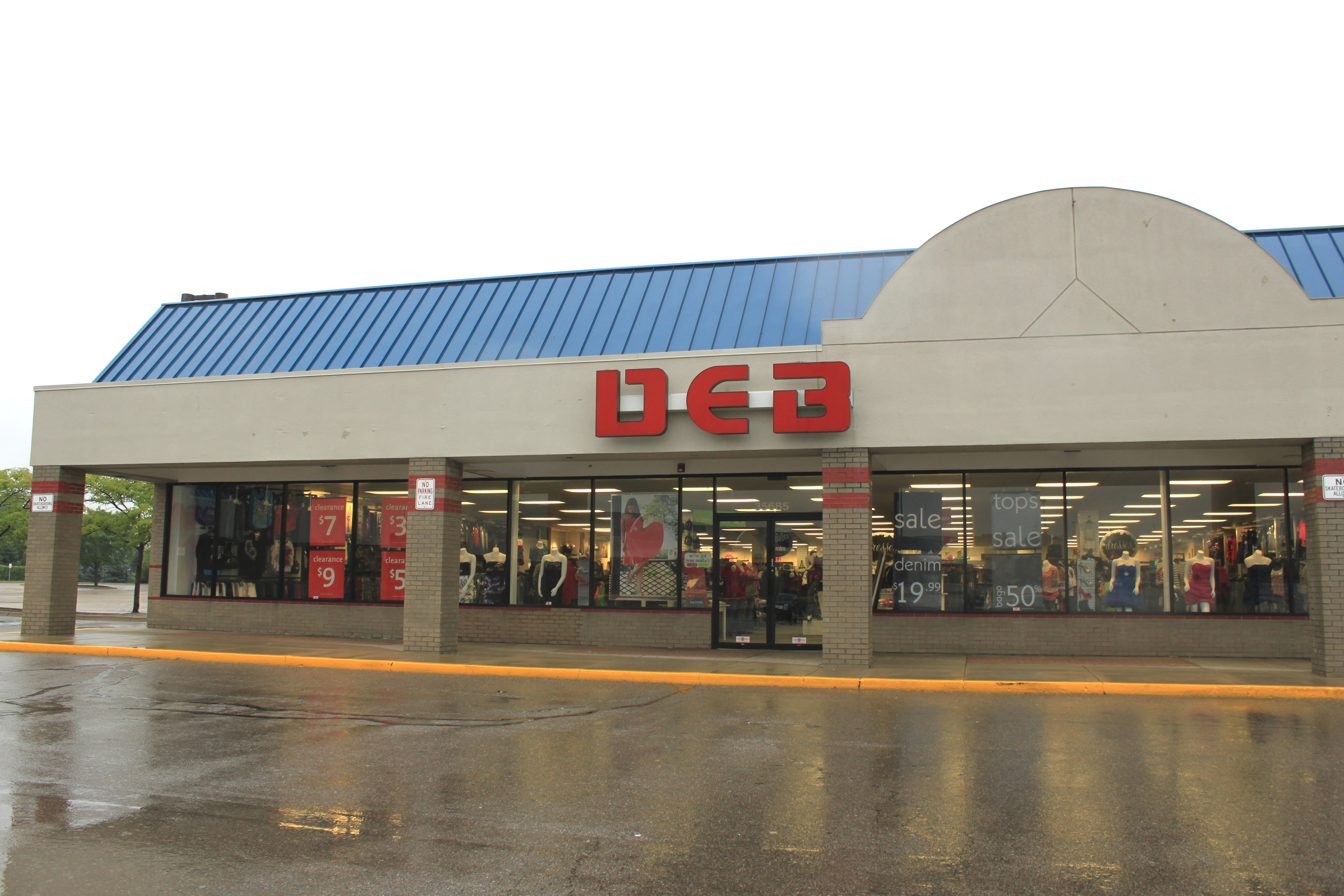
DEB shop, Westland, Michigan

The company expanded in the Philadelphia area in the 1950s. The company co-founder Philip Rounick's son, Marvin Rounick, became more involved in the management of the company after joining in 1961. Co-founder Aaron Weiner's son, Warren Weiner, followed suit in 1965. During this time the company observed the new phenomenon of suburban growth and construction of shopping malls. They decided to open stores in several locations, make the stores larger, and offer more merchandise.

In the 1970s, Marvin Rounick and Warren Weiner closed most of the neighborhood stores and focused on opening larger stores in shopping malls. The chain was renamed to Deb Shops and re-focused on women's and girls' clothing.

Deb Shops acquired Atlantic Book Stores in 1995. In 1998, it operated 18 Atlantic book outlets, including 12 largely seasonally operated small Atlantic Book Shops in Delaware, Maryland, Pennsylvania and New Jersey resort towns, along with six larger Atlantic Book Warehouses carrying a full line of book titles and magazines, and reported combined retail sales of $205.1 million.

The company was listed on the NASDAQ Exchange under the ticker symbol DEBS. However it was removed from the exchange after being acquired in 2007 by the investment firm of Lee Equity Partners for $395 million, or $28.45 per share.

The company parent DSI Holdings filed for bankruptcy on June 27, 2011. They filed for bankruptcy again on December 4, 2014. On January 7, 2015, they announced that they would close all 295 stores. The final sales happened on March 30, 2015. By September 2015 the company returned as an online-only retailer selling plus-size clothing. They shut down their website at the end of 2018 in December without warning. The last posts from the company's social media were about sales in November and December of 2015.

Following the dissolution of Deb Shops, a separate, Israeli-owned, US-incorporated company, ASBS Holdings Inc., published a plus-size online store under the same name, with the addition of a hyphen in its website name and url, using the tagline, "Your Plus Size There".
