= Tourism in Omaha, Nebraska =

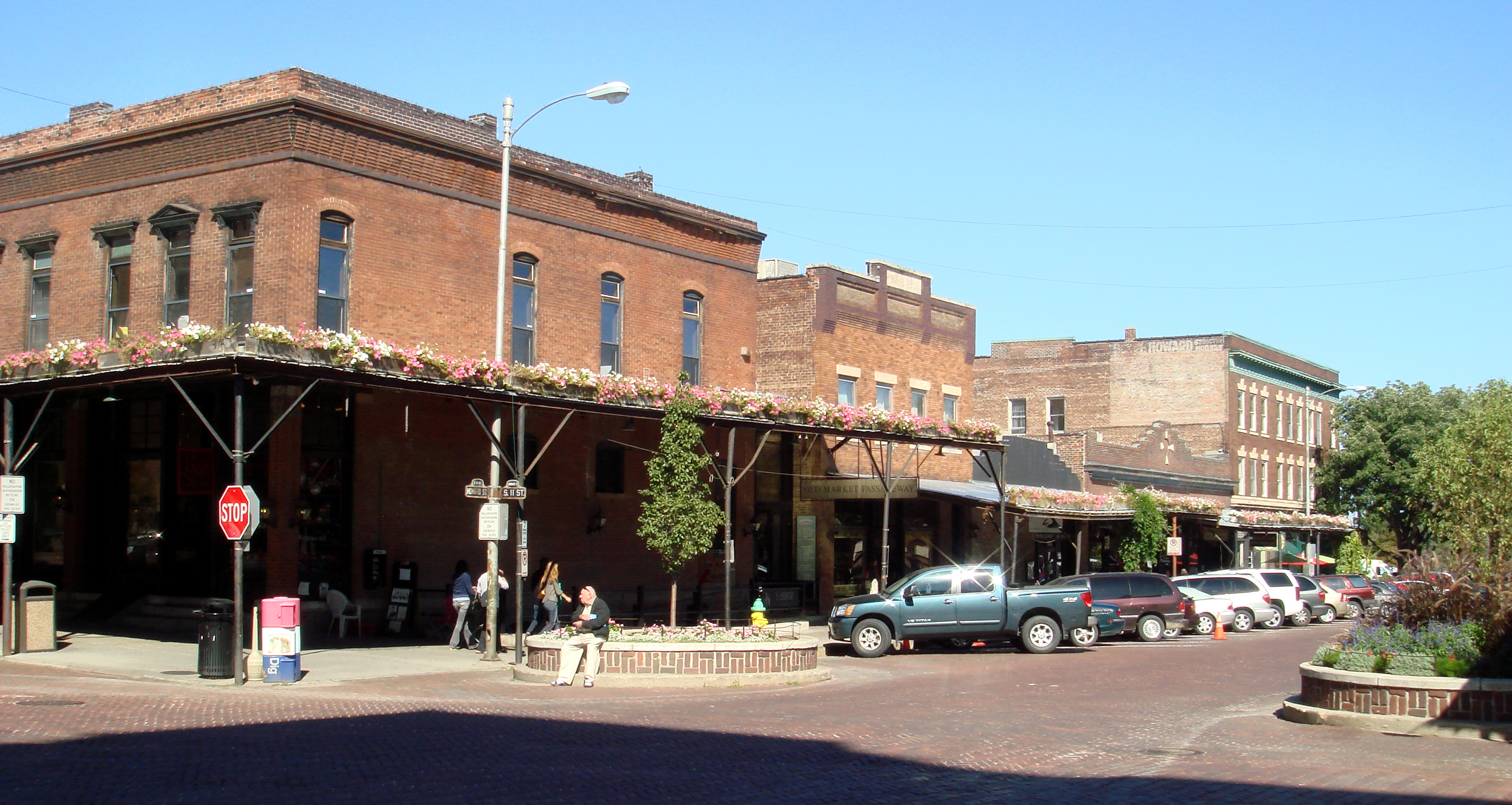
The heart of the Downtown Omaha's Old Market.

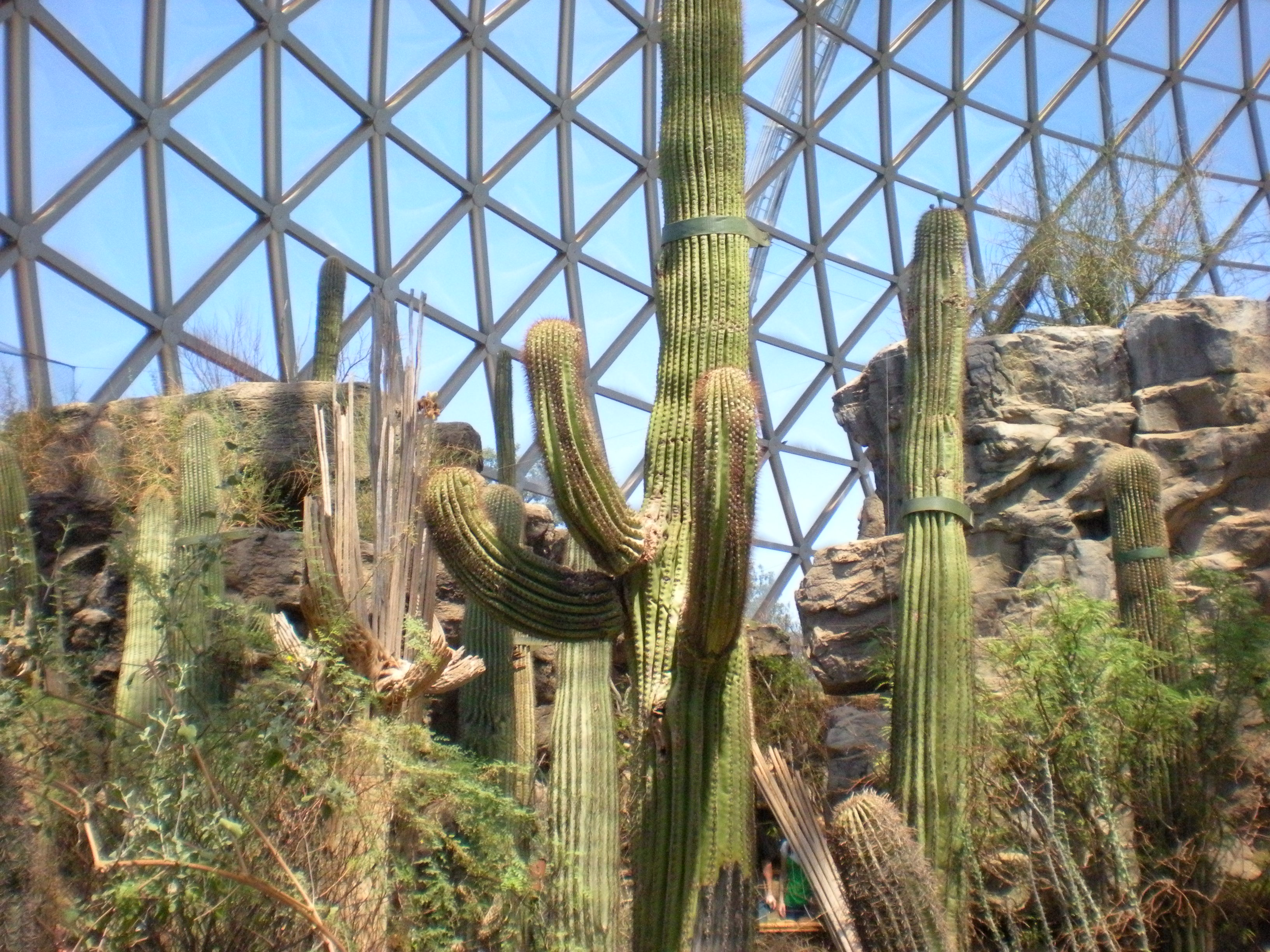
The Desert Dome at Omaha's Henry Doorly Zoo

Tourism in Omaha, Nebraska, United States offers visitors history, sports, nature and cultural experiences. Its principal tourist attractions are the Henry Doorly Zoo and the College World Series (CWS). A 2003 study by a Creighton University economist estimated that the CWS added $33.8 million to the city's economy that year. With 1.1 million visitors annually, the Henry Doorly Zoo is Nebraska's most popular tourist attraction. In 2007 Omaha hosted the USA Roller Sports National Championships, along with 10,000 people who auditioned for the American Idol television show at Qwest Center Omaha.

Research on per capita spending on leisure and hospitality situates Omaha in the same tier as the neighboring cities of Topeka, Kansas, Kansas City, Missouri, Oklahoma City, Oklahoma, and Denver, Colorado. In 2002 the United States Conference of Mayors ranked Omaha 70th out of the top 100 cities for tourism in the United States.

== Background ==
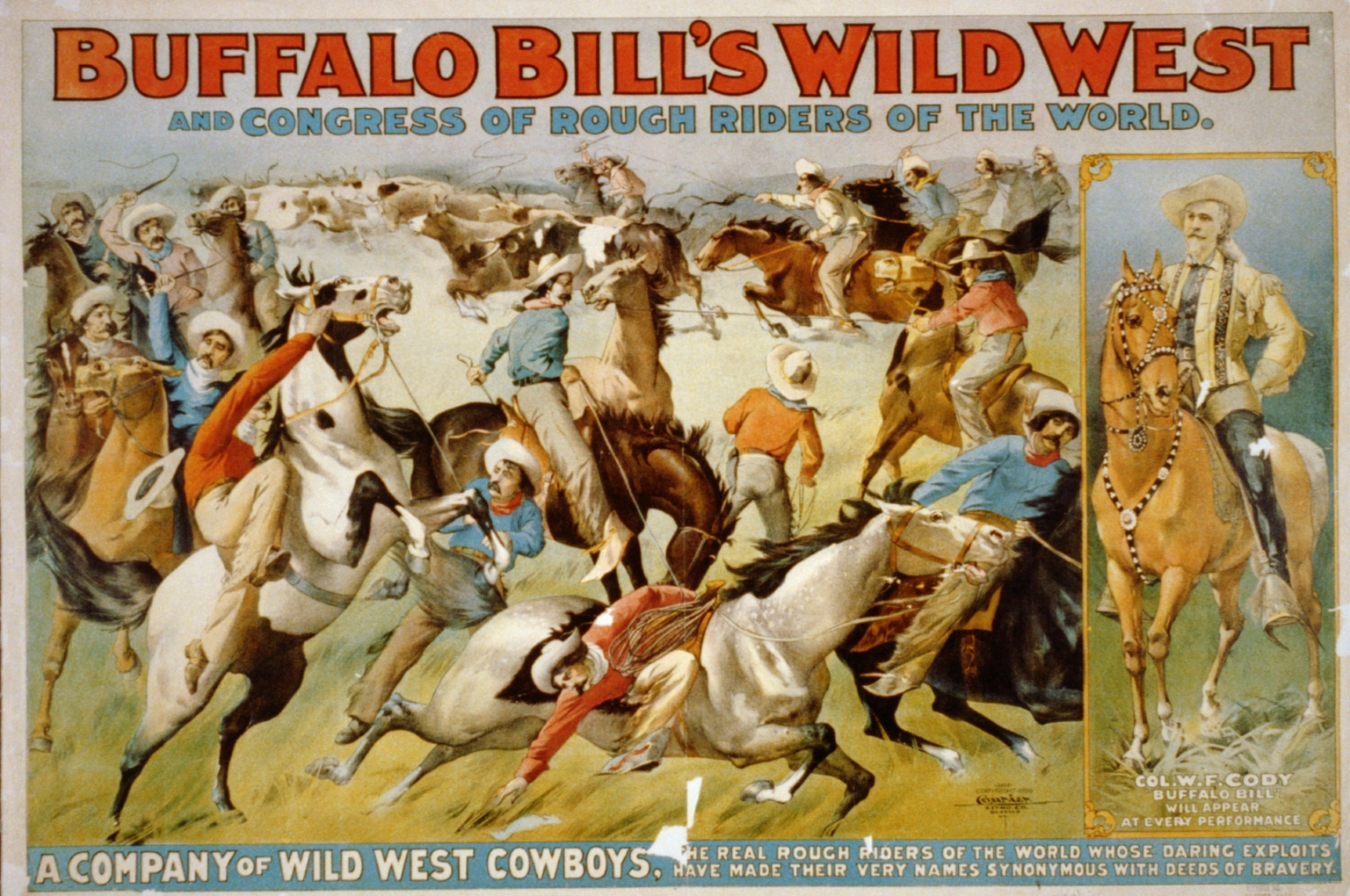
A handbill for Buffalo Bill's Wild West and Congress of Rough Riders of the World.

Omaha has been a tourist destination for many years. Famous early visitors included as Rudyard Kipling and General George Crook, who stayed at pioneer institutions such as the Douglas House, Cozzens Hotel and the original Paxton Hotel in the city's early years. The Omaha Driving Park hosted the first official performance of the Buffalo Bill's Wild West in 1883, with eight thousand attendees. In 1898 the city hosted more than 1,000,000 visitors from across the United States at the Trans-Mississippi and International Exposition, a world's fair that lasted for more than half the year.

== Attractions ==
The most popular tourist attraction in Omaha is the Henry Doorly Zoo. In May 2004, it was voted by Reader's Digest as the best zoo in America, with the largest cat complex in North America. Also, in a survey conducted by Disney-owned Family Fun Magazine, the zoo was ranked as "America's #1 Family Friendly Attraction." Fun-Plex and the Heartland of America Park provide other outdoor settings, while other important attractions include the Joslyn Art Museum, Johnny Rosenblatt Stadium baseball field, Omaha Children's Museum, and the historic Old Market arts and entertainment district. TD Ameritrade Park opens downtown in 2011. The Westroads, Crossroads, Village Pointe and Oakview Malls offer a wide variety of shopping, while the Qwest Center Omaha is a vast multipurpose facility.

=== Culture ===
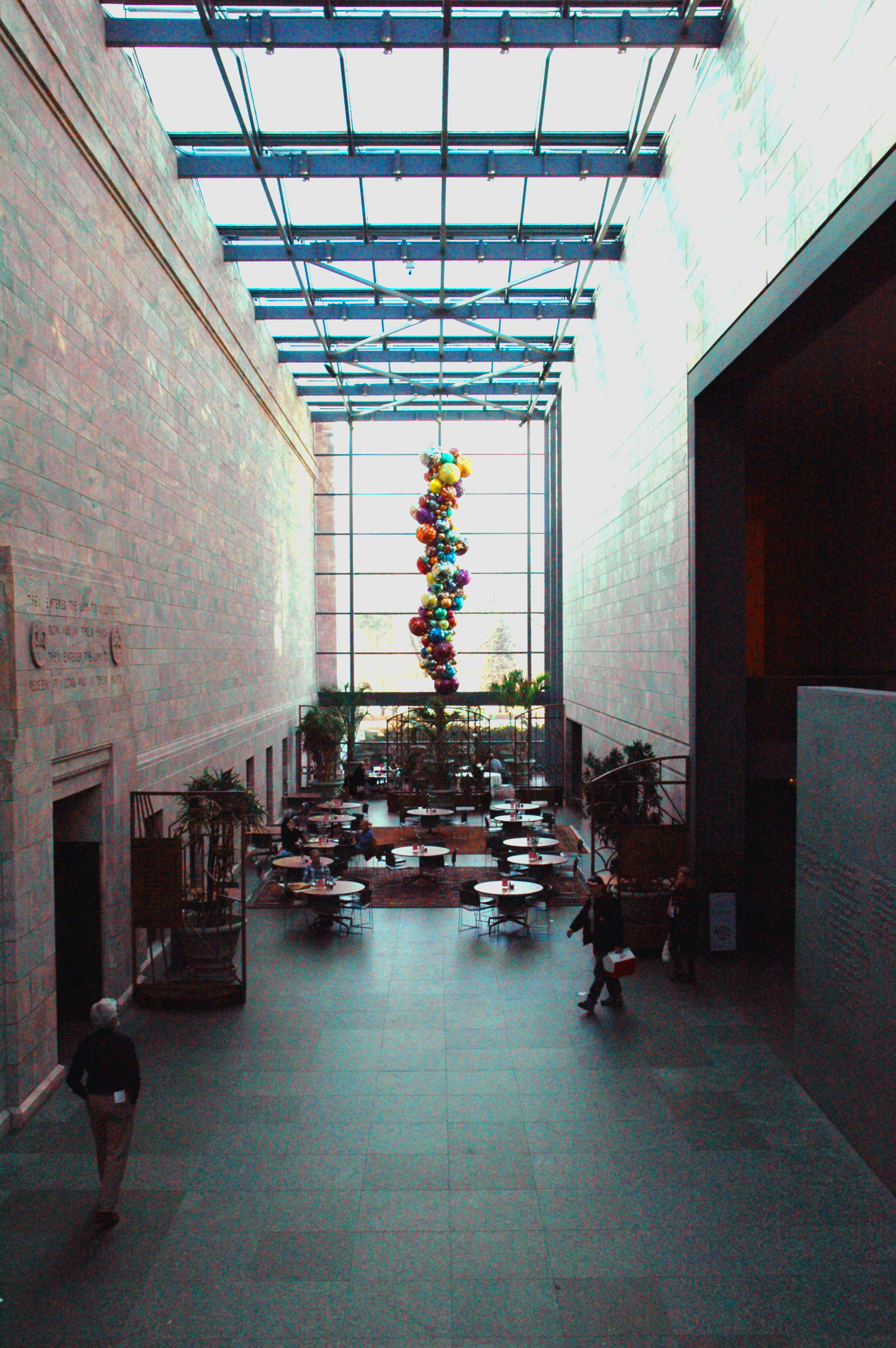
Dale Chihuly's Glowing Gemstone Polyvitro Chandelier at the Jolsyn Art Museum.

Omaha is home to a variety of cultural attractions. Research shows Omaha surpasses (in cultural and performing arts per capita) neighboring Des Moines, Oklahoma City, Topeka, Tulsa and Wichita for its cultural attractions, while lagging behind Denver, Kansas City and Minneapolis, Minnesota for cultural attractions, in turn .

The Creighton Orpheum Theater is a performing arts center located in downtown Omaha, Nebraska. The home of the "Broadway In Omaha" series and Opera Omaha, the theater has hosted a variety of performers, including W.C. Fields, Bing Crosby, Bob Hope and Al Jolson. Omaha's Union Station plays host to the Durham Western Heritage Museum. Dedicated to preserving and displaying the history of the Western United States, it features the history of Omaha, as well as a variety of special collections including the Byron Reed Collection. El Museo Latino in South Omaha and the Dreamland Ballroom are cultural bookmarks in the city's most diverse communities, while events such as Native Omaha Days, the Festival of the Virgin of Guadalupe, the Day of the Dead and many other holidays celebrate the city's broad racial and ethnic roots.

The Toddler Farm at the Omaha Children's Museum gives children 4 and younger a place for imagination, while creative arts and dress up areas are for younger children as well. A hands-on science gallery and television studio and traveling exhibits are designed to help children discover how the world works and learn through play. The principal fine arts museum in the state of Nebraska is located in Omaha. The Joslyn Art Museum, opened in 1931, is the only museum in Nebraska with a comprehensive permanent collection that includes works from antiquity to the present day. Highlights include works by Lorenzo di Credi, El Greco, Edgar Degas, Claude Monet, Albert Bierstadt, and Thomas Hart Benton along with American masters Grant Wood, Jackson Pollock, Dale Chihuly and George Segal. The Bemis Center for Contemporary Arts features three galleries, including studio space and housing for artists chosen from applicants all over the world.

Omaha has a thriving performing arts community that includes the Magic Theatre, a 40-year-old experimental theatre, along with Astro Theatre, which hosts the Emmy Gifford Children's Theater. The Holland Performing Arts Center was built in 2005 with the overwhelming support and generosity of the Omaha community. The Holland Center specializes in events requiring a more acoustical environment, including performances by the Omaha Symphony.

According to the Nebraska Department of Economic Development, other notable cultural attractions in Omaha include the Artists Cooperative Gallery, Czechoslovak Museum, Loves Jazz and Arts Center, Lozier IMAX Theater, Omaha Community Playhouse and the historic Orpheum Theater.

=== Sports ===
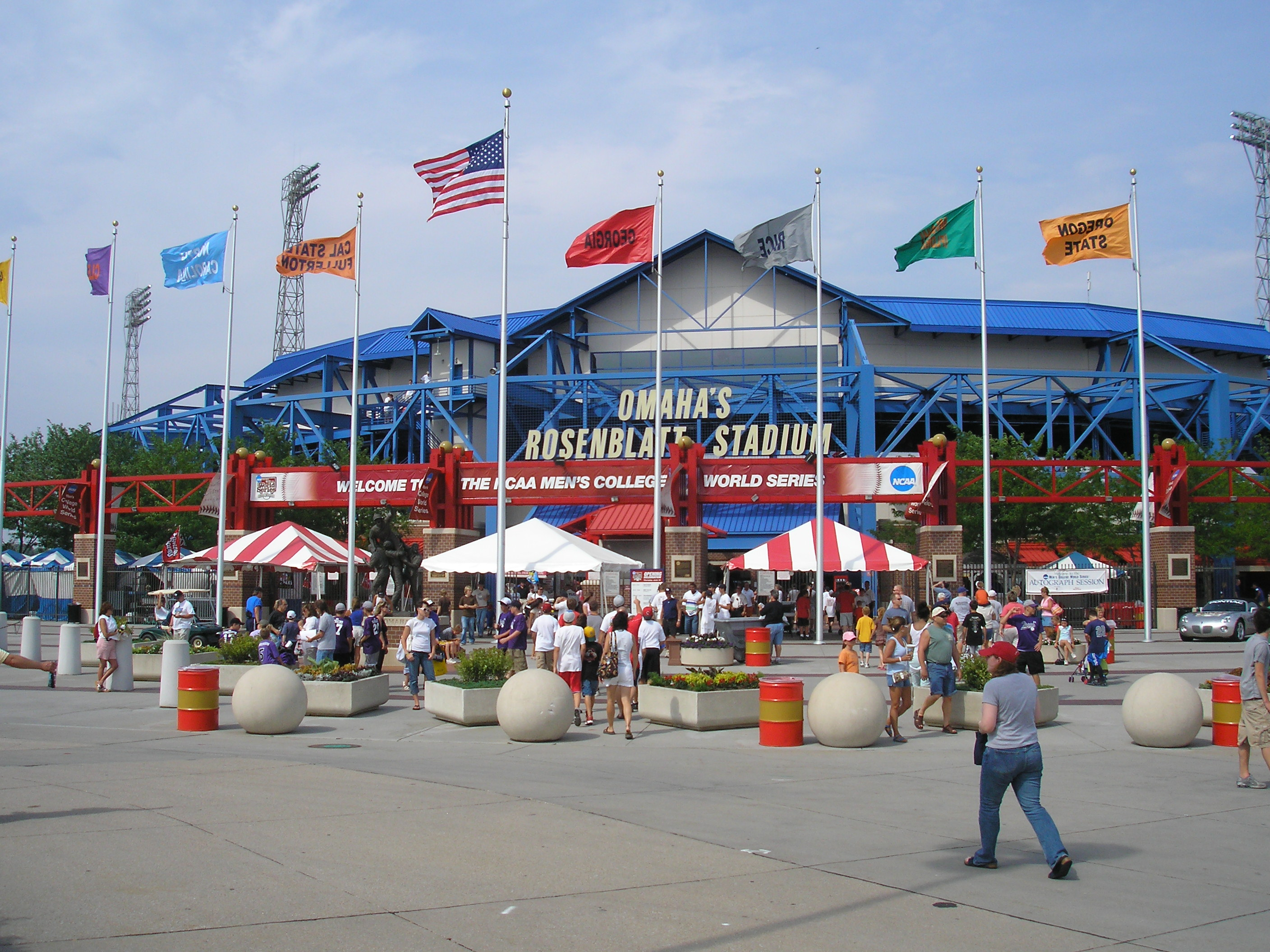
The Rosenblatt Stadium, former home of the Omaha Royals (now Omaha Storm Chasers) and the College World Series.

TD Ameritrade Park became the new home of the annual College World Series, known as the CWS in 2011. The Johnny Rosenblatt Stadium was a baseball stadium that formerly served as the home of the CWS. In the event eight out of 250 college teams from across the US have come to Omaha since 1950 to compete, bringing much of Omaha's population out to support them. In 2003 a Creighton University analysis found that 48.5 percent of CWS attendees were from outside Nebraska and that 7.4 percent were Nebraskans from outside Omaha. That year visitors to the tournament spent more than $22 million directly in the metropolitan area, generating more than $2.3 million in local and state taxes. After being threatened with the loss of the event in 2007, the city recently signed an agreement to keep the event in Omaha past 2010 by building a new stadium in the city's NoDo neighborhood.

Built in 2011, Werner Park is the new home to the AAA Omaha Storm Chasers baseball team. Rosenblatt Stadium was home to the minor league Omaha Royals until 2010. Across the Missouri River in Council Bluffs, Iowa is the Mid-America Center, an arena and convention center.

The Omaha Civic Auditorium is a multi-purpose convention center seats up to 9,300 people for sporting events and up to 10,960 for concerts. Events at the Civic include sporting events, concerts, car and boat shows, trade shows, concerts, smaller conventions, local graduations, dog shows and craft shows. The current home to the Omaha Beef indoor football team, it also hosts the Creighton University women's basketball and volleyball teams. In 2007 the facility hosted the USA Roller Sports National Championships. CenturyLink Center Omaha is an arena and convention center including an 18,300-seat arena, a 194,000 feet (59,000 m) exhibition hall and 62,000 feet (19,000 m) of meeting space. It hosts basketball games, hockey games and concerts, as well as the annual shareholder meeting for Berkshire Hathaway.Was torn down in late 2016.

=== History ===
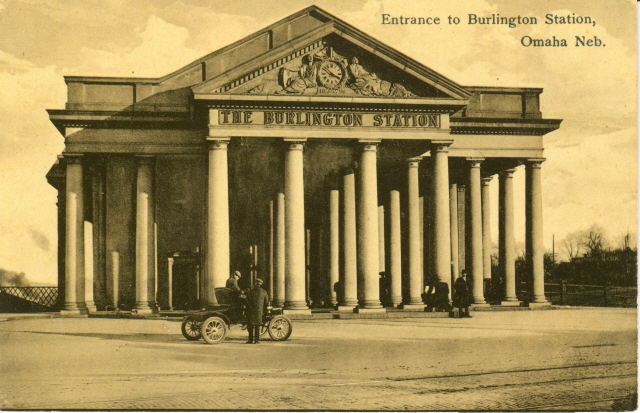
A 1910 postcard showing the front entrance of Omaha's Burlington Station.

Founded in 1854, Omaha has a rich historical legacy present throughout the city today. Tourism has always been important to the city, with famous visitors such as Rudyard Kipling and General George Crook staying there in the city's early years. The Omaha Driving Park hosted the first official performance of Buffalo Bill's Wild West Show in 1883, with eight thousand attendees. In 1898 the city hosted more than 1,000,000 visitors from across the United States at the Trans-Mississippi and International Exposition, a world's fair that lasted for more than half the year.

With a downtown core where the city was settled, the city's Old Market Historic District is a haven to tourists and locals alike. The Old Market is abutted with the Omaha Rail and Commerce Historic District as well as the Omaha Warehouses MPS, each with several notable buildings. Downtown Omaha was also home of the Jobbers Canyon Historic District, where many of the important outposts and settlements along with Oregon Trail west of Omaha were outfitted.

60,000 to 80,000 tourists visit the Mormon Trail Center and the Mormon Pioneer Cemetery in the Florence neighborhood every year. The north side of Omaha boasts a long history of peaks and lows. This area of town includes the Fort Omaha Historic District, an 1878 U.S. Army post on the western frontier, as well as several historic neighborhoods essential to the city's growth and development.

Other notable historic attractions in Omaha include the General Crook House at Fort Omaha, Boys Town, Florence Mill, Gerald R. Ford Birthsite and Gardens, Joslyn Castle, Lewis and Clark Landing, Malcolm X Birthsite, Mormon Trail Center at Historic Winter Quarters, Nebraska Jewish Historical Society and Riekes Museum, The Rose Theater, and Freedom Park, home to the USS Hazard and the USS Marlin, both World War II-era vessels.

=== Nature ===
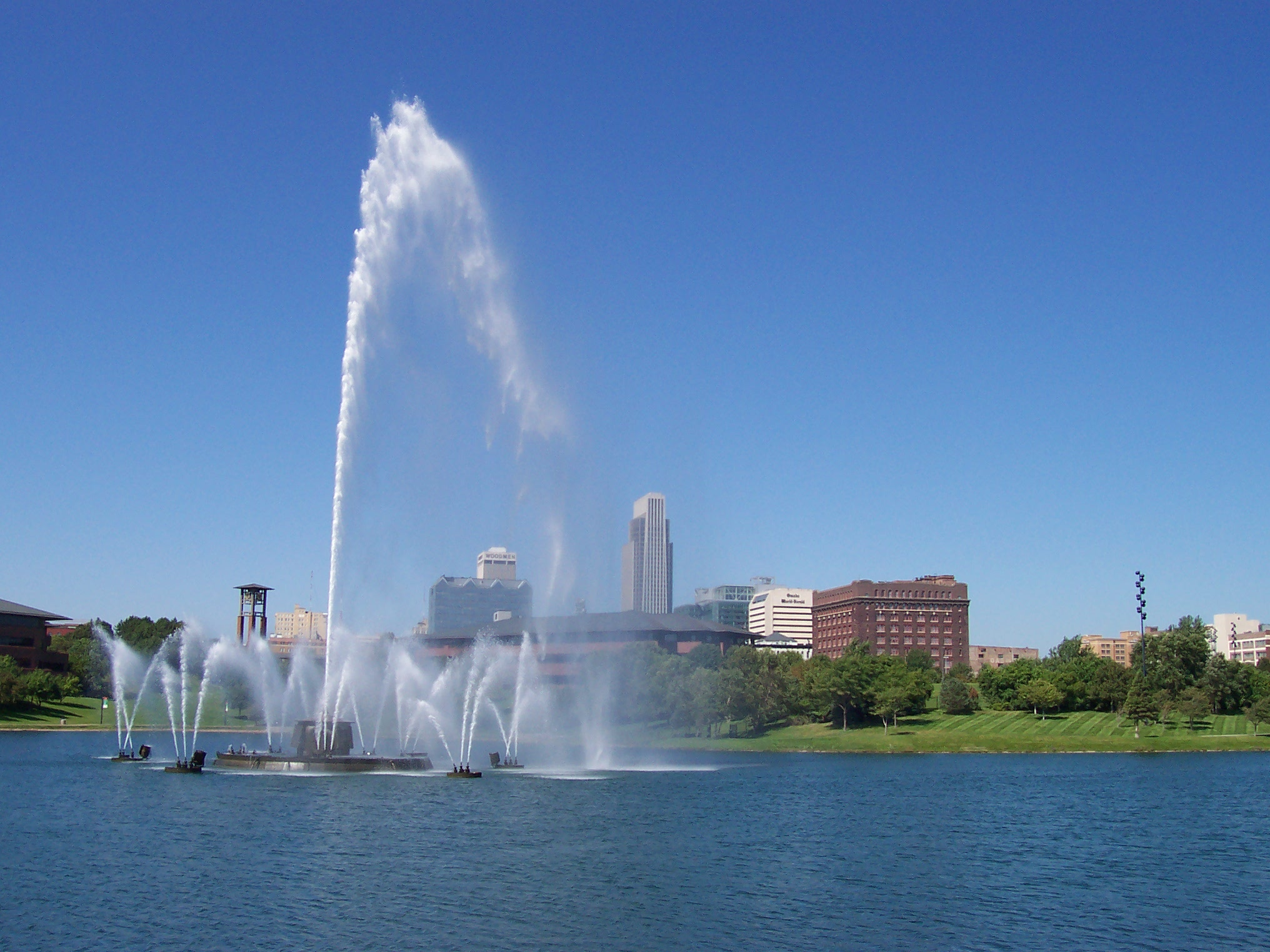
The fountain at Heartland of America Park with Downtown Omaha's skyline behind.

Omaha is home to dozens of public parks, several with highlights for tourists. The Heartland of America Park is a Downtown Omaha feature that includes a fountain and gondola rides on a lake with two fountains, with one that shoots water 300 feet (91 m) into the air during a colorful nighttime light show. Omaha's Lauritzen Gardens is a 100-acre (0.40 km^{2}) botanical garden features a holiday poinsettia show in December. Other popular parks in the city include Dodge Park, Glenn Cunningham Lake, the Gene Leahy Mall, and the lakes in the Lower Papio Valley. The city also has more than 80 miles (130 km) of recreational trails for biking, running, hiking and strolling, and the soon-to-be-completed Missouri River Pedestrian Bridge, which will be the crown jewel of the city's trail system.

Omaha's Henry Doorly Zoo is nationally renowned for its leadership in animal conservation and research. Evolving from the public Riverview Park Zoo established in 1894, today the Zoo includes several notable exhibits. They include a new "Butterfly and Insect Pavilion," Scott Aquarium, "Orangutan Forest" and "Hubbard Gorilla Valley." "Kingdoms of the Night" is the world's largest nocturnal exhibit. The Lied Jungle is the world's largest indoor rain forest, and the "Desert Dome" is the world's largest indoor desert. There is also 350-seat cafeteria style restaurant, concessions, gift shops, a tram and live steam train.

Fontenelle Forest and the Neale Woods Nature Center are owned by the nonprofit Fontenelle Nature Association. Each location features miles of trails, nature exhibits, and educational activities for families and children. There are also accessible trails at Fontenelle Forest, in addition to valuable historical information.

Other notable outdoor attractions in Omaha include Mt. Vernon Gardens, N.P. Dodge Park, Prairie View Lake and Recreation Area, Standing Bear Lake, Wehrspann Lake at Chalco Hills Recreation Area, and Zorinsky Lake.

=== Entertainment ===
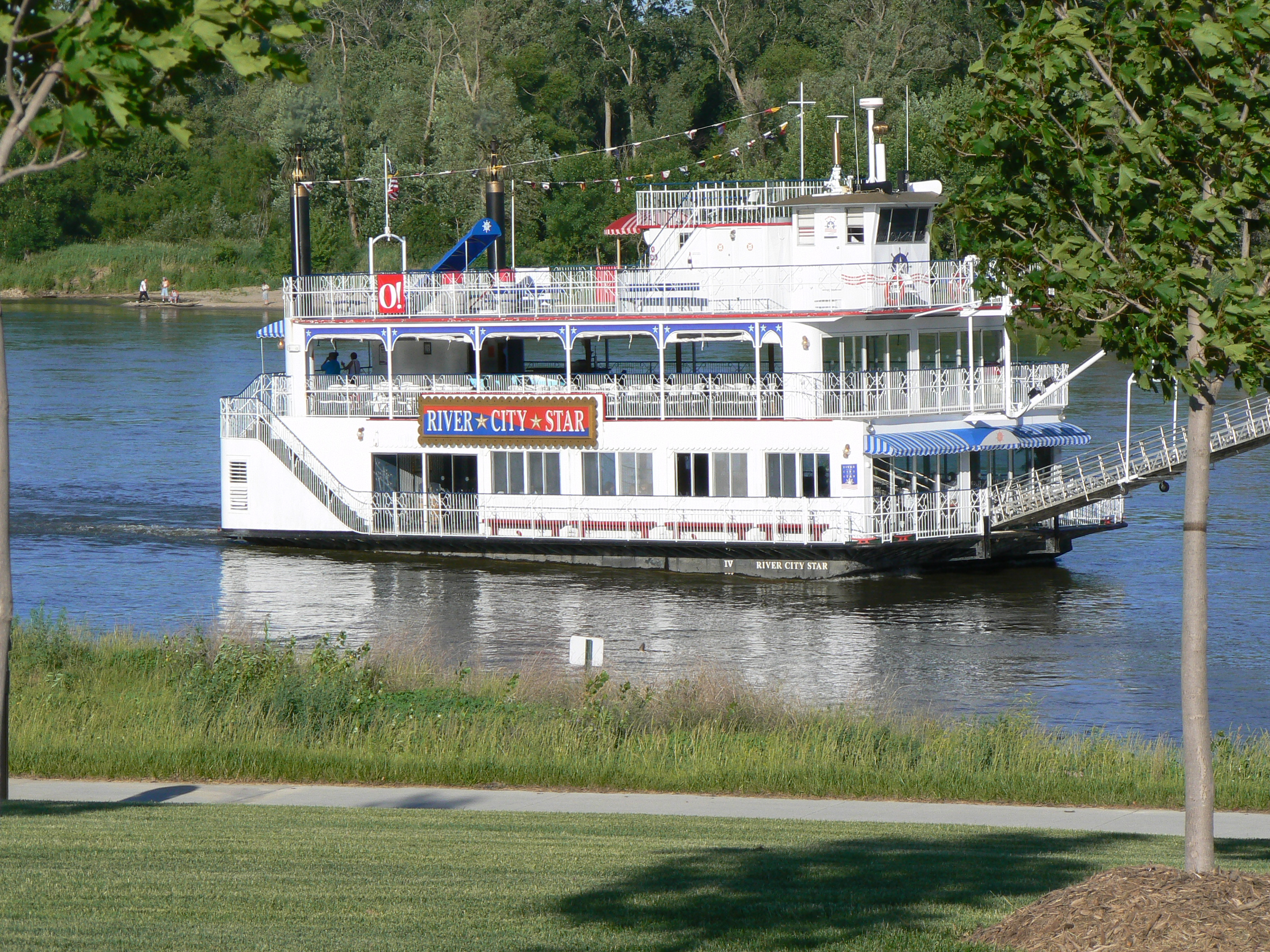
The River City Star, a passenger excursion paddle wheel on the Missouri River.

A combination amusement park and water park called Funplex includes 12 rides, a junior roller coaster and several midway activities. The water park has a wave pool, lazy river, kiddie pool and two waterslides. Past amusement parks have included the turn-of-the-century Krug Park and the more recent Peony Park. The Amazing Pizza Machine is a national award-winning family entertainment center located in the Millard neighborhood. It was named a "Top Family Entertainment Center of the World" in 2007.

=== Regional ===
Eastern Nebraska and western Iowa feature a variety of tourist destinations. Several of these attractions are located 25 miles (40 km) southwest of downtown Omaha, near Interstate 80 Exit 426. The Lee G. Simmons Conservation Park and Wildlife Safari, a drive-through park with scenic prairies and wetlands that features dozens of native North American animals including bison, elk, cranes and new Wolf Canyon overlook along with tram rides and a visitor center. Nearby, the 300,000-square-foot (28,000 m^{2}) Strategic Air and Space Museum features a glass atrium, two aircraft display hangars, a traveling exhibit area, a children's interactive gallery, a 200-seat theater, a Museum store, an aircraft restoration gallery, and a snack bar. The glass atrium encases a Lockheed SR-71 Blackbird. Other sites in the area include Mahoney State Park and Platte River State Park, which provide a variety of options for outdoor activities, along with Schramm Park State Recreation Area. Schramm is a unique geologic and botanical area along the Platte River valley, and is home to the Ak-Sar-Ben Aquarium.

North of Omaha, the DeSoto National Wildlife Refuge provides a refuge for migrating waterfowl and is the winter home of more than 100 bald eagles. Across the Missouri River from Omaha in Council Bluffs, Iowa are the historic General Dodge House, the 1885 Pottawattamie County Jail, Kanesville Tabernacle, and the RailsWest Railroad Museum. In 2003 Council Bluffs had the 19th largest casino market in the U.S. with revenue equaling nearly $434 million. Casinos include Ameristar, Harrah's, and the Horseshoe Casino. Council Bluffs hosted the World Series of Poker in 2007.

=== Other ===
The University of Nebraska at Omaha was founded 1908 as Omaha University. The second-largest institution of higher education in Nebraska, it has a strong academic reputation. UNO is the home of the Peter Kiewit Institute a $70 million state-of-the art computer science facility and engineering facility, making it one of the premier computer science, management information systems and bioinformatics programs in the region.

The Air Force's 55th Wing, the Fightin' Fifty-Fifth, is stationed at Offutt Air Force Base. Each branch of the U. S. Military is represented among the approximately 12,000 military and federal employees assigned here.

Other notable attractions in Omaha include St. Cecilia Cathedral, as well as a number of landmarks in North Omaha.

== Government support ==
The Omaha Convention Center and Visitors Bureau works on behalf of both the City of Omaha and Douglas County to promote conventions and tourism in Omaha and Douglas County. An interlocal agreement allows the two governments to share funding, duties and other support for tourism. The city recently began a $150,000 project to promote Omaha tourism to Omaha residents. According to a researcher at Lycoming College in Pennsylvania the strategy is part of a new and growing national movement.

In turn, tourism in Omaha supports local government, as one recent study found that $1,000,000 in cultural tourism specifically creates approximately $83,000 in state and local taxes as well as supporting 32 jobs for the metropolitan area, which in turn leads to additional tax revenue for government.

== See also ==
- Omaha Landmarks
