= MoPac Trail =

Rail trail in Nebraska, United States

Coordinates: 40°49′25″N 96°38′21″W

The MoPac Trail is a rail trail in Nebraska. It is a bicycling, equestrian, and walking trail built on an abandoned Missouri Pacific Railroad corridor that runs for 26 miles (42 km) from Lincoln, Nebraska, to Wabash, Nebraska.

== History ==
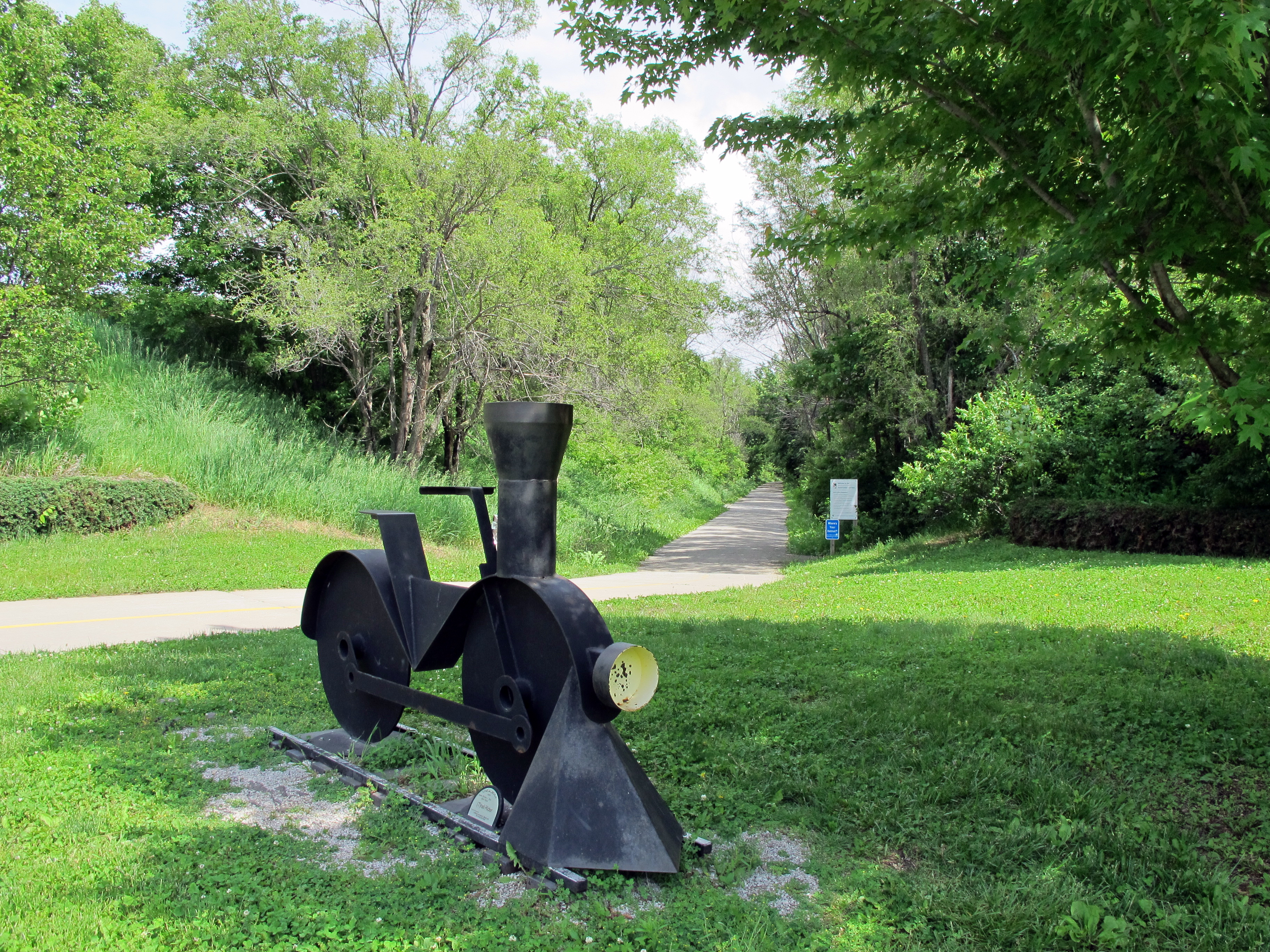
MoPac Trail East, east of S. 84th Street in Lincoln.

The corridor that is now the MoPac Trail was part of the Missouri Pacific Railroad's Omaha Belt Line until 1984. The 4-mile (6.4 km) portion of the MoPac Trail within the Lincoln city limits was purchased by the city in 1989. Two years later, an additional 22 miles (35 km) of former MP railway corridor was purchased by the Nebraska Trails Foundation and the Great Plains Trail Network; this portion of the trail is commonly referred to as the MoPac East Trail. The deed to this land was then transferred to the Lower Platte South Natural Resources District. The MoPac East section opened in 1994 and is part of the national American Discovery Trail network.

There are planned western and eastern extensions of the MoPac Trail. To the west, an extension to connect it with other trails in the vicinity of the University of Nebraska–Lincoln campus is planned. To the east, the MoPac is planned to be connected with a trail extending south and west of Omaha. This planned extension crosses over the Platte River near South Bend, Nebraska. As of 2010, the portion from Springfield on Nebraska Highway 50 is completed and extends southward towards to the Platte River. The bicycling and pedestrian bridge across the Platte River is complete; however, the trail ends on the west side of the river. Therefore, the current gap in the trail is from near Wabash to near South Bend.

== Trail guide ==
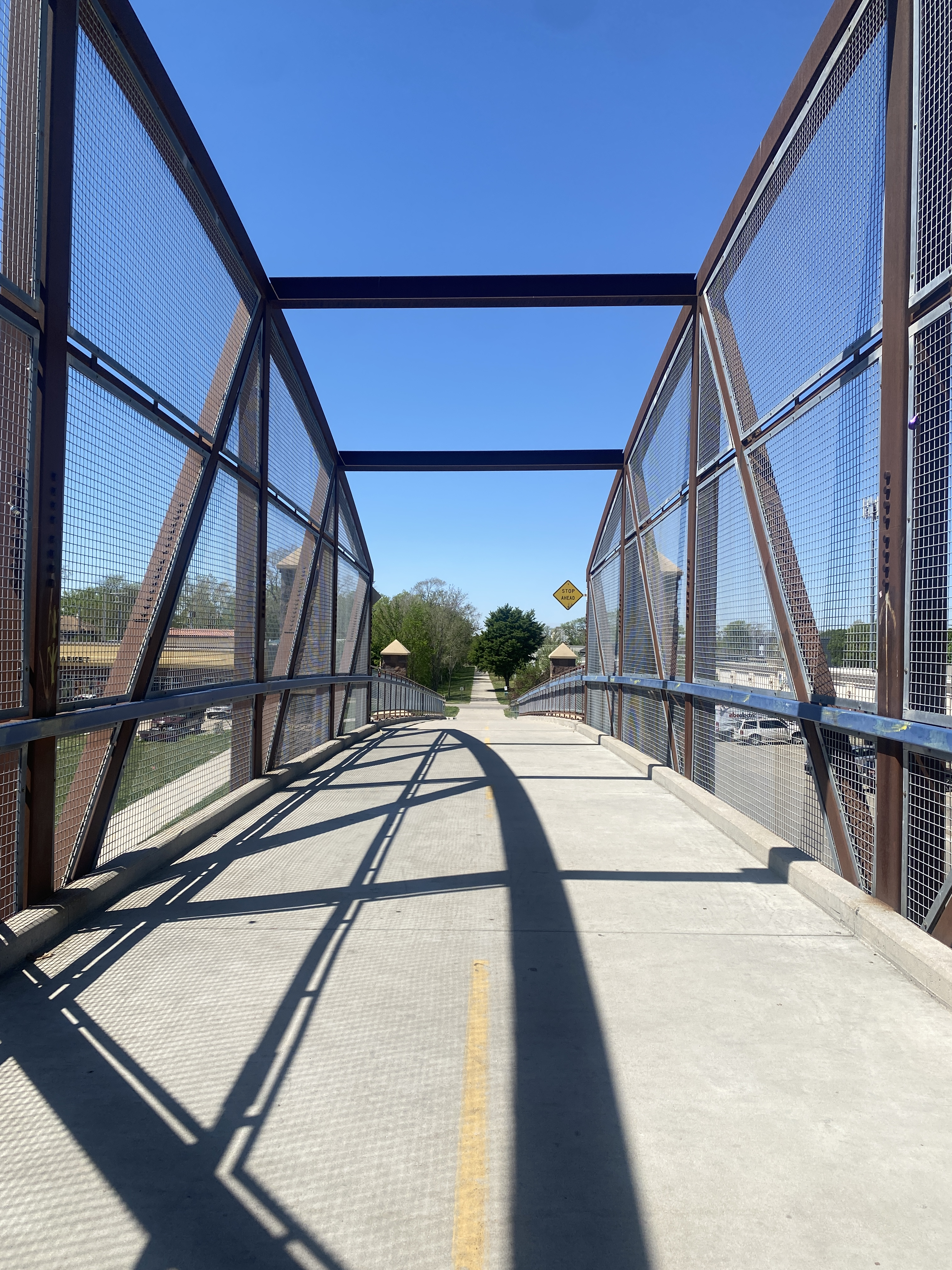
MoPac Trail West Bridge Over N 27th St, Lincoln

Communities along the MoPac Trail are (from west to east):

- Lincoln
- Walton
- Eagle
- Elmwood
- Wabash
- Louisville
- Springfield

The west trailhead of the MoPac East section is two blocks south of 84th and O Street in Lincoln. The westernmost six miles (10 km) of the trail are paved; the remainder is crushed limestone.

== See also ==
- Trails in Omaha
