= Carl Jonas =

American author (1913-1976)

Carl S. Jonas (22 May 1913 – 1 October 1976) was an American author, journalist, and educator best known for his 1952 novel Jefferson Selleck which was a finalist for the National Book Award. His work often explored Midwestern life, personal identity, and the search for meaning.

== Early life and education ==
Jonas was born in Omaha, Nebraska in 1913, the son of surgeon Dr. August F. Jonas, who had settled in Omaha in 1889. He attended secondary school at the Phillips Exeter Academy in New Hampshire and The Governor's Academy in Massachusetts before graduating from Williams College where he was active in the drama club.

After graduating in 1936, Jonas spent nearly a year traveling around the world. He bicycled across Europe, traveled to India in steerage, and continued on to China, first as a deckhand and later again in steerage. Although his mother had given him money intended for a summer in Europe, he stretched it into a global journey.

== Career ==
=== Early writing years ===
Jonas began his writing career at the Omaha World-Herald, initially working without pay before eventually being compensated by the inch of printed copy and later receiving a regular salary.

In 1937, he moved to Chicago to work as a freelance radio scriptwriter, and later relocated to New York, where he continued writing while living on a modest income.

During World War II, he served in the U.S. Coast Guard in the Aleutian Islands. In 1944, he published an article in the Saturday Evening Post titled My First Day on Tarawa, recounting the capture of the Japanese outpost. During his Coast Guard service, he also wrote his first novel, Beachhead on the Wind.

=== Later career as author/educator ===
Jonas continued writing novels. In 1957, he also began teaching English at the Municipal University of Omaha (later the University of Nebraska Omaha).

Many of Jonas' novels were set in the American Midwest, often in the city of Gateway, which was believed to be a fictionalized version of Omaha, Nebraska.

In Jefferson Selleck, the titular character has a heart attack during his daughter's wedding and is left to recover. For the next few months, during his recovery period with which the pace of his life has significantly slowed, Selleck reflects upon his life, asking existential questions such as "What does it all mean?", "Who am I?", "Why am I here, and where am I going?" Earlier, Selleck had been an owner of a musical auto-horn company called Yaw-Et-Ag, in the fictional midwestern town of Gateway. He soliloquizes his thoughts on a tape recorder as he looks back upon his life and reflects on his loved ones. Eventually, Selleck decides that his dedication to work is more important than the other themes he explored, he decides to return to work and dies soon afterwards.

Jefferson Selleck was a Time magazine Book-of-the-Month Club choice for February 1952.

Reviewing the novel Lillian White Deer in the New York Times, Conrad Knickerbocker stated that the work "contains enough material for good fiction — even though too much of it reads like a first draft". Knickerbocker also stated that Jonas will be remembered for his previous work Jefferson Selleck, "a far better novel."

In 1974, as his health declined due to emphysema, Jonas began writing a nostalgic column for the Omaha World-Herald titled The View from Pigeon Bend.

== Personal life ==
Jonas married Lydia Tukey in 1946. During their marriage, he divided his time between their home in Aspen, Colorado and Omaha. The couple later divorced.

In 1962, he married Edith Marie (Larsen) Louis, widow of Karl Louis Sr. She was active in civic affairs. The following year, they built a glass-walled A-frame home on a 60-acre property north of Omaha. Jonas worked in a loft office overlooking the woods and river. Edith Marie died in 1970 after a long illness.

Jonas died in 1976 at age 63 from a heart attack.

== Philanthropy ==
A committed naturalist, Jonas believed in preserving the beauty of the Nebraska landscape. In 1975, he donated a 45-acre tract of land to Fontenelle Forest Association in memory of his father, Dr. A. F. Jonas, one of the forest's founders and a pioneer in Nebraska medicine. Through his will, he later left additional land to the association, including his home.

In 1978, funds from his estate were used to purchase a 47-acre tract from Agnes H. Koley to connect the Jonas land to Neale Woods, a nature preserve. The access road was named Edith Marie Avenue in honor of his late wife.

== Bibliography ==
=== Novels ===
- Beachhead on the Wind (1945)
- Snowslide (1950)
- Jefferson Selleck (1952)
- Riley McCullough (1954)
- Our Revels Now Are Ended (1957)
- Lillian White Deer (1964)
- The Observatory (1966)
- The Sputnik Rapist (1973)
