= Playland Park =

Playland Park may refer to:

- Playland (New York), an amusement park in Rye, New York
- Playland Park (Indiana), a former amusement park in South Bend, Indiana
- Playland Park (Houston, Texas), a former amusement park in Houston
- Playland Park (San Antonio, Texas), a former amusement park in San Antonio

== See also ==
- Playland (disambiguation)
- Dodge Park Playland in Council Bluffs, Iowa
