= Edith Neale =

Historian, educator, preservationist, naturalist

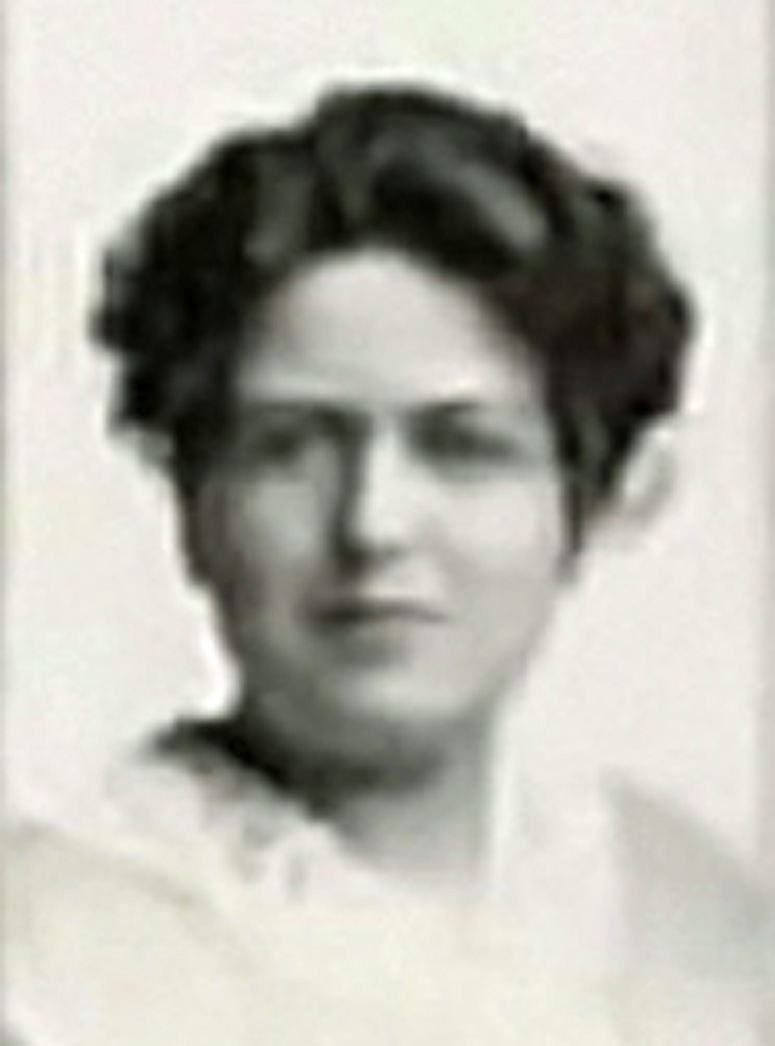
Edith Neale in 1913

Edith Louise Neale (January 12, 1891 – May 21, 1980) was an American educator, historian, preservationist, and naturalist from Washington County, Nebraska. Best known as the namesake and first land donor of Neale Woods, she devoted her life to researching, writing, and preserving the history of Fort Atkinson and Washington County. She served as curator and later director of the Washington County Historical Museum and as secretary of the Fort Atkinson Foundation.

== Early life and family background ==
Edith Louise Neale was born on January 12, 1891, in rural Fort Calhoun, Nebraska to David Neale and Alice Mary Brain Neale.

Her father, David, born January 2, 1834 in Bredon, Worcestershire,, emigrated to the United States in 1853 or early 1854 and settled at Rockport near Fort Calhoun. This land remained in the family for more than a century and later became the core of Neale Woods. On September 25, 1879, he married Alice Brain, and had five children, including Edith. David was the inventor of multiple Rip-Rap systems.

== Education ==
Edith Neale graduated from Central High School in Omaha in 1910, commuting to classes by train. She earned her bachelor's degree from the University of Nebraska in 1914 and later completed graduate studies at the University of Chicago. In 1926 she attended a summer course at Oxford University, studying English literature and history as part of a group of Central High School teachers, followed by a European tour.

== Career in education ==
Neale taught English in Midwestern high schools for seven years and then at private junior colleges for another seven years. After leaving teaching, she dedicated herself to historical research and writing, producing numerous articles on Washington County history.

== Historical preservation work ==
In 1938, Neale helped organize the Washington County Historical Museum and became its first curator when it opened. She later served as director and continued arranging exhibits for decades. In 1962, she was appointed secretary of the Fort Atkinson Foundation, contributing to early fundraising efforts to purchase and preserve the fort site.

== Personal life ==
In addition to her interest in history, Neale enjoyed hiking and nature. She joined the Omaha Walking Club in 1923. That same year she traveled with club members to South Dakota and continued on to Glacier National Park with her two sisters and two other members. In March 1934, Neale led the club on an all-day outing to the Fort Calhoun area. Members traveled by bus from Omaha, then hiked past the site of Fort Atkinson and across surrounding terrain noted for its historical significance.

Known for her stamina, she continued hiking well into her 70s and 80s, often outpacing much younger walkers.

== Neale Woods donation ==
In 1971, Neale donated the first 120-acre tract of what would become Neale Woods to the Fontenelle Forest Association. The land, part of her family's original homestead, was designated to remain in its natural state for hiking and school programs. At the press conference announcing the gift, Neale led reporters and board members on a vigorous hike across the property.

In 1980, she was named the first director emeritus of Fontenelle Forest.

== Death and legacy ==
Edith Neale died on May 21, 1980. Her legacy endures through Neale Woods, her extensive contributions to the preservation of Nebraska's history, and the Edith Neale Gallery at the Washington County Museum. She is buried in Fort Calhoun Cemetery.
