= Playland =

Playland may refer to:

== Entertainment venues ==
- Playland (Fresno), an amusement park in Fresno, California, U.S.
- Playland (New York), an amusement park in Rye, New York, U.S.
- Playland (Vancouver), an amusement park in Vancouver, British Columbia, Canada
- Playland (San Francisco), a former amusement park in San Francisco, California, U.S.
- Playland Café, a historic gay bar in Boston, Massachusetts, U.S.
- Dodge Park Playland, a former amusement park in Council Bluffs, Iowa, U.S.
- Rockaways' Playland, a former amusement park in Queens, New York, U.S.
- Playland-Not-At-The-Beach, a non-profit museum in El Cerrito, California, U.S.
- Playland's Castaway Cove, an amusement park in Ocean City, New Jersey, U.S.

== Other uses ==
- Playland (album), a 2014 album by Johnny Marr
- Playland, a companion comic to Pippin published by Polystyle Publications
- Playland, a 1994 novel by John Gregory Dunne
- Land of Toys, known as Playland in some translations (original name: Paese dei balocchi), a fictional location in the Italian novel The Adventures of Pinocchio (1881-1883) by Carlo Collodi and several adaptations of the story in other media

== See also ==
- Playland Park (disambiguation)
