= Springfield, Nebraska =

City in Sarpy County, Nebraska, United States

- City
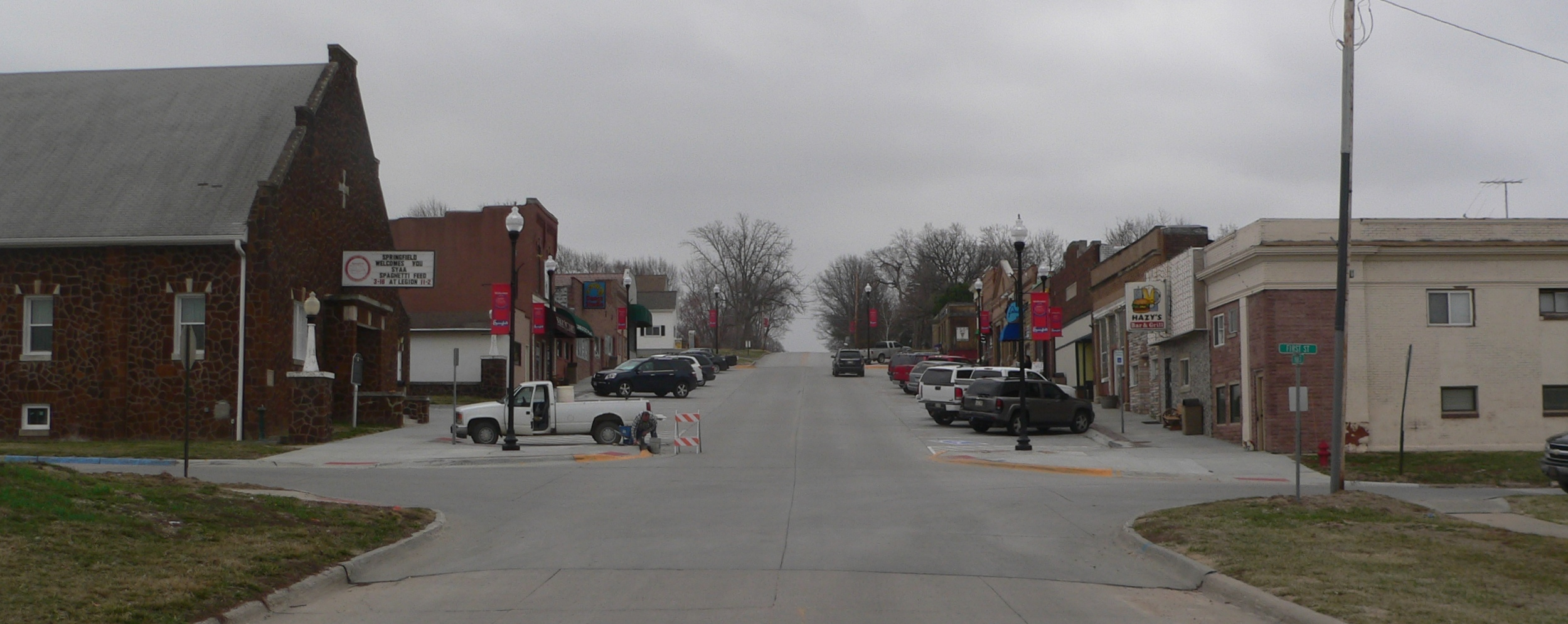
- Main Street (2012)

- Location of Springfield within Sarpy County and Nebraska
- Coordinates: 41°04′56″N 96°07′57″W
- Country: United States
- State: Nebraska
- County: Sarpy

Area
  - Total: 1.62 sq mi (4.19 km^{2})
  - Land: 1.62 sq mi (4.19 km^{2})
  - Water: 0 sq mi (0.00 km^{2})
- Elevation: 1,109 ft (338 m)

Population (2020)
  - Total: 1,501
  - Density: 929/sq mi (358.6/km^{2})
- Time zone: UTC-6 (Central (CST))
  - Summer (DST): UTC-5 (CDT)
- ZIP code: 68059
- Area codes: 402, 531
- FIPS code: 31-46520
- GNIS feature ID: 2395943
- Website: springfieldnebraska.com

Springfield is a small town in Sarpy County, Nebraska, United States. The population was 1,501 at the 2020 census.

== History ==
Springfield was platted in 1873 by a U.S. Civil War veteran named J. D. Spearman. This was done in anticipation of the coming of the Missouri Pacific Railroad. The town was named from several springs nearby.

== Geography ==
According to the United States Census Bureau, the city has a total area of 0.69 square miles (1.79 km^{2}), all land.

The nearest hospital is Midlands Hospital (9.1 miles distant), located in Papillion. Papillion is also the location of the county courthouse.

== Demographics ==
Historical population
Census	Pop.	Note	%±
1900	400		—
1910	463		15.8%
1920	413		−10.8%
1930	419		1.5%
1940	370		−11.7%
1950	377		1.9%
1960	506		34.2%
1970	795		57.1%
1980	782		−1.6%
1990	1,426		82.4%
2000	1,450		1.7%
2010	1,529		5.4%
2020	1,501		−1.8%
U.S. Decennial Census; 2018 Estimate

=== 2010 census ===
As of the census of 2010, there were 1,529 people, 575 households, and 423 families living in the city. The population density was 2,215.9 inhabitants per square mile (855.6/km^{2}). There were 604 housing units at an average density of 875.4 per square mile (338.0/km^{2}). The racial makeup of the city was 95.8% White, 0.7% African American, 0.1% Native American, 0.2% Asian, 0.5% from other races, and 2.7% from two or more races. Hispanic or Latino of any race were 1.8% of the population.

There were 575 households, of which 37.6% had children under the age of 18 living with them, 56.2% were married couples living together, 11.7% had a female householder with no husband present, 5.7% had a male householder with no wife present, and 26.4% were non-families. 21.9% of all households were made up of individuals, and 8.6% had someone living alone who was 65 years of age or older. The average household size was 2.66 and the average family size was 3.12.

The median age in the city was 37.3 years. 27.7% of residents were under the age of 18; 8.1% were between the ages of 18 and 24; 23.5% were from 25 to 44; 29.5% were from 45 to 64; and 11.2% were 65 years of age or older. The gender makeup of the city was 51.4% male and 48.6% female.

=== 2000 census ===
As of the census of 2000, there were 1,450 people, 529 households, and 405 families living in the city. The population density was 2,655.2 inhabitants per square mile (1,025.2/km^{2}). There were 544 housing units at an average density of 996.1 per square mile (384.6/km^{2}). The racial makeup of the city was 98.69% White, 0.21% African American, 0.21% Asian, 0.14% from other races, and 0.76% from two or more races. Hispanic or Latino of any race were 1.45% of the population.

There were 529 households, out of which 38.2% had children under the age of 18 living with them, 64.5% were married couples living together, 9.5% had a female householder with no husband present, and 23.4% were non-families. 19.7% of all households were made up of individuals, and 7.8% had someone living alone who was 65 years of age or older. The average household size was 2.74 and the average family size was 3.16.

In the city, the population was spread out, with 27.6% under the age of 18, 10.1% from 18 to 24, 28.6% from 25 to 44, 23.8% from 45 to 64, and 9.9% who were 65 years of age or older. The median age was 36 years. For every 100 females, there were 94.9 males. For every 100 females age 18 and over, there were 91.6 males.

As of 2000 the median income for a household in the city was $48,083, and the median income for a family was $54,236. Males had a median income of $36,193 versus $23,950 for females. The per capita income for the city was $19,573. About 1.9% of families and 2.6% of the population were below the poverty line, including 3.1% of those under age 18 and 4.8% of those age 65 or over.

== Attractions ==
Springfield is the site of the Sarpy County fair held every August. The MoPac Trail runs from Springfield south to the Platte River. This trail will connect Omaha to Lincoln upon completion.{}

== In popular culture ==
- The music video for "You and I" by Lady Gaga was filmed in Springfield between July 21–24, 2011.

== See also ==
- List of municipalities in Nebraska
