= Neale Woods =

Nature preserve in North Omaha, Nebraska

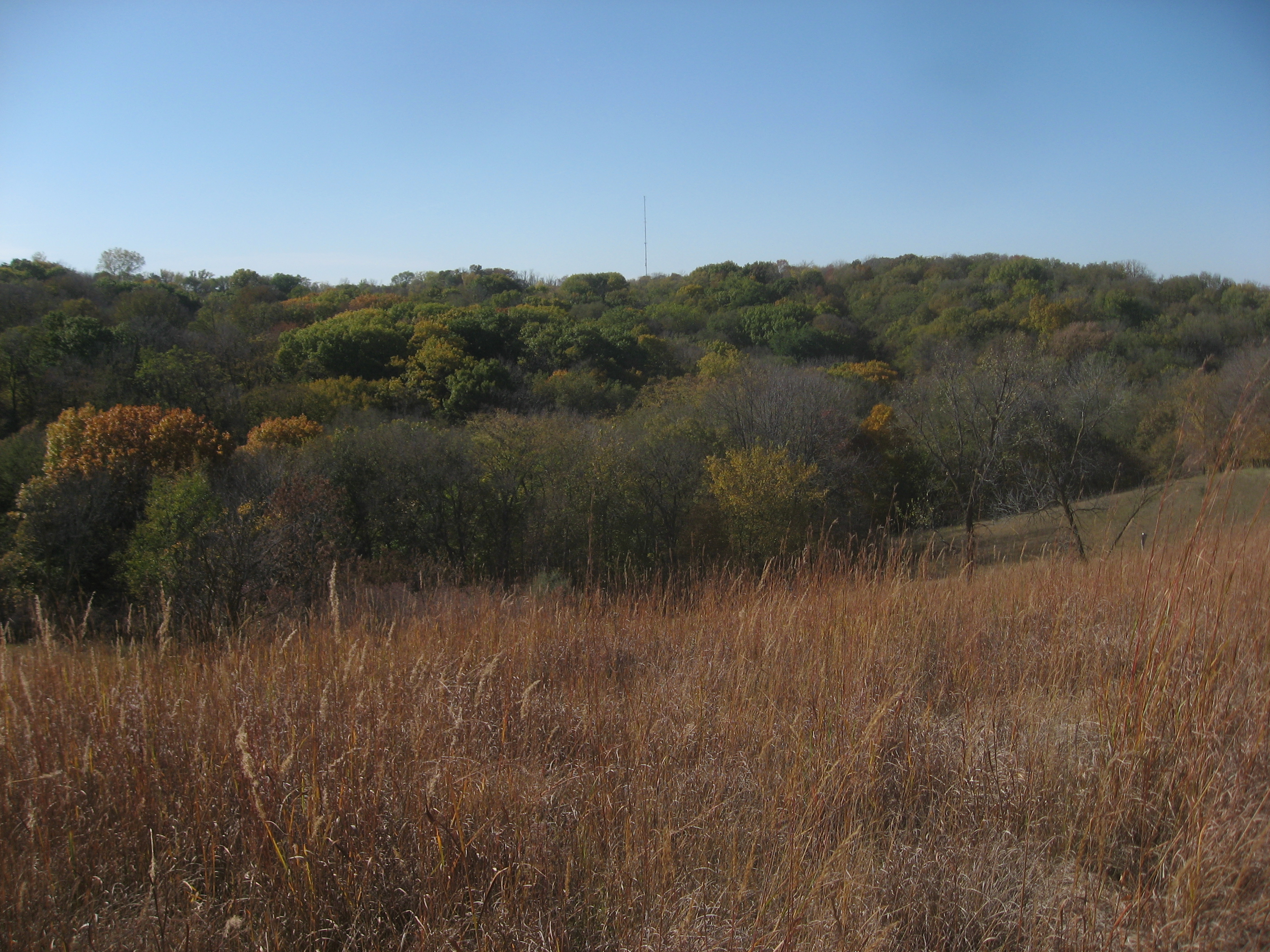
- Interactive map of Neale Woods
- Type: Nature center
- Location: North of Omaha, Nebraska, United States
- Coordinates: 41°23′23.15″N 95°57′6.55″W
- Area: 600 acres (240 ha) (2.42 km²)
- Created: 1971
- Operator: Fontenelle Forest
- Status: Open year round

Neale Woods is a nature preserve nearly 600 acres in size in North Omaha, Nebraska. Located about 10 miles north of Downtown, Neale Woods is located in the Ponca Hills on top of the Missouri River Valley. It is operated by Fontenelle Forest.

== History ==
Neale Woods was begun with a donation of 120 acres of land by Edith Neale in 1971. Neale's father had homesteaded the land in the mid-1800s. An additional 60 acres of contiguous land was given by author Carl Jonas, whose father had been one of the founding members of Fontenelle Forest. After his death, a bequest from Jonas' estate made possible the purchase of 112 acres of additional land. Of that amount, 25 acres were cleared and designated as prairies, planted in a way thought to be representative of the land in the mid-1800s. Jonas' former home served as the Neale Woods Nature Center until it was removed in 2022.

== Facilities ==
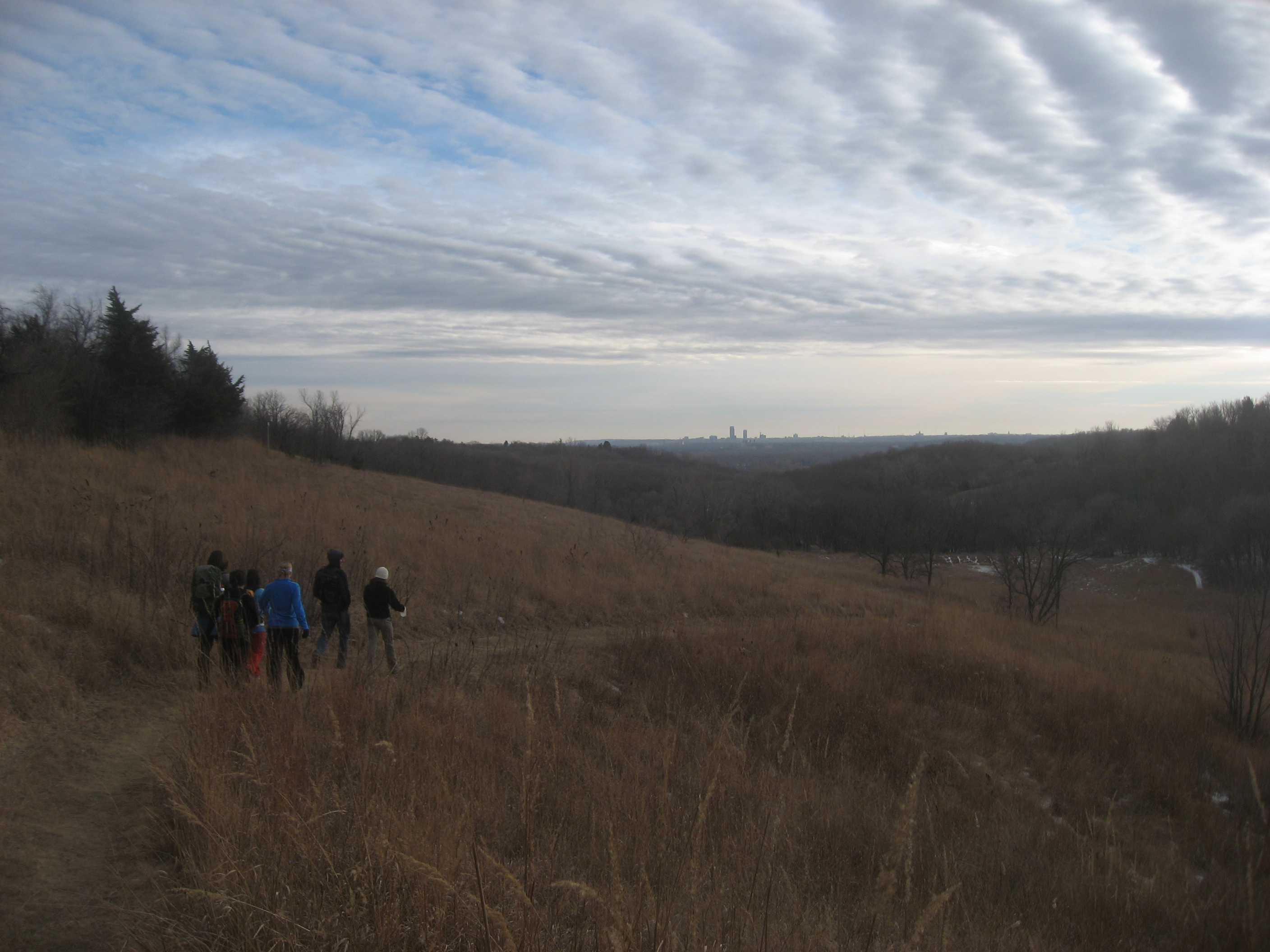
Gifford Trail, on the eastern edge of Jonas Prairie. Downtown Omaha skyline is visible to the south in the distance

Trails are open every day from dawn until dusk. An information Kiosk, picnic tables, and composting toilet is available. A trail map is available on the Fontenelle Forest website.

== Astronomy ==
Neale Woods was home to the Millard Observatory, which was the largest public observatory in the Omaha metropolitan area. Astronomy nights were generally held two times per month, between the months of August and May.

Featured telescopes included:

- 10” Schmidt-Cassegrain
- 2 - 12” Meade LX 200 GPS
- 14” Celestron
- 13” Coulter
- 8” Meade
- 3 - 6” telescopes

The Observatory closed in 2013 and the equipment moved to the Strategic Air Command & Aerospace Museum.

== See also ==
- Fontenelle Forest
- Trails in Omaha
- Tourism in Omaha, Nebraska
