= The Amazing Pizza Machine =

Family entertainment center in Omaha, Nebraska

Coordinates: 41.2027°N 96.1332°W

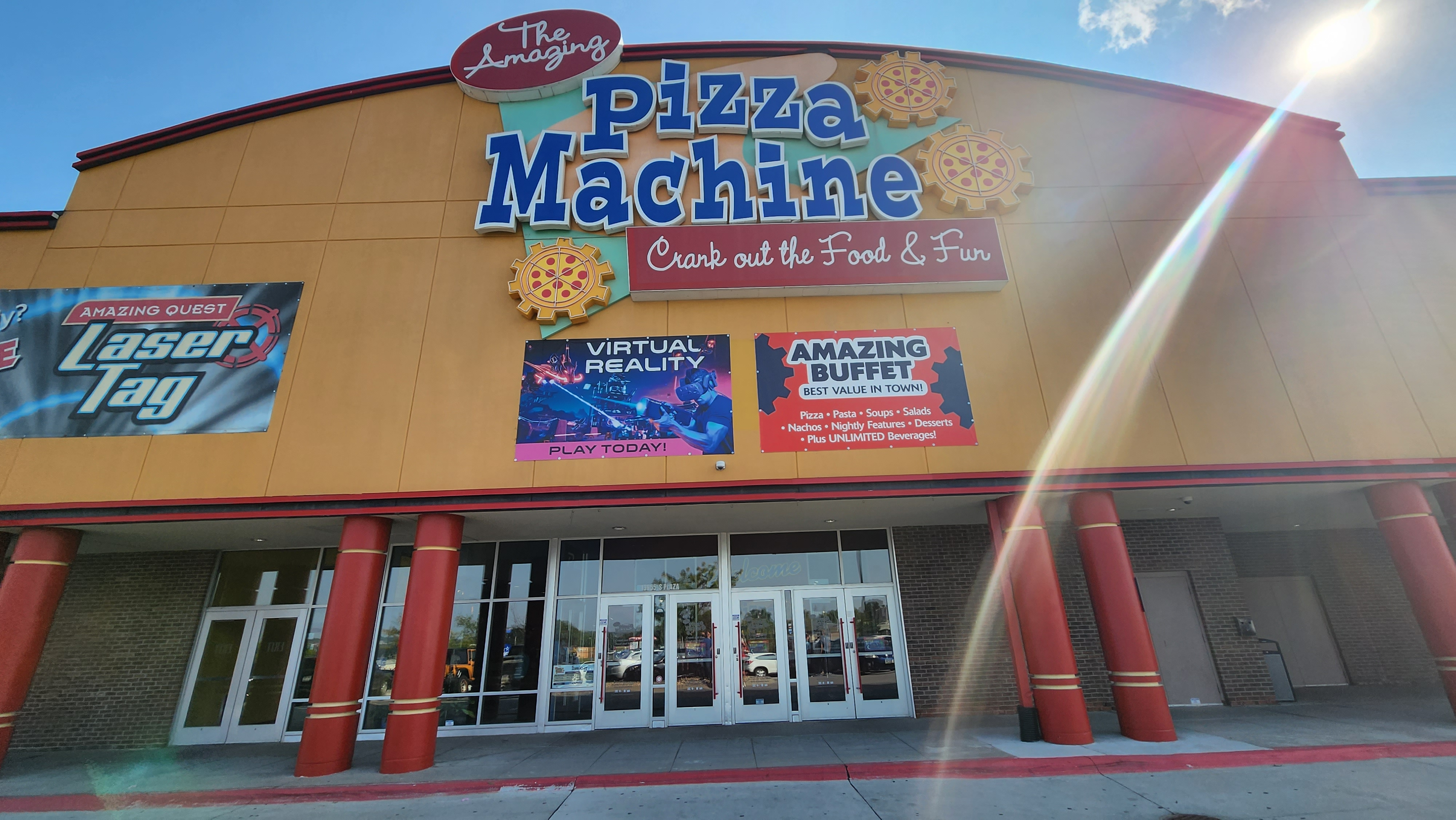
Exterior of The Amazing Pizza Machine as of 2023.

The Amazing Pizza Machine is a family entertainment center located in the Millard area of Omaha, Nebraska. According to Play Meter magazine, the Amazing Pizza Machine has an "array of games, rides, and attractions all under one roof are unparalleled in the region." The facility has received several industry awards, including being named a "Top Family Entertainment Center of the World" by the International Association of Amusement Parks and Attractions in 2007. The Amazing Pizza Machine is owned in part by the co-owners of Valentino's Pizza.

== About ==
The Amazing Pizza Machine is a 64,000-square-foot (5,900 m^{2}) Family Entertainment Center including an amusement arcade with video games, laser tag, go karts, bumper cars and other rides and a buffet dining area. After being planned throughout 2005, the business was founded in 2006 by 6 4 Fun LLC, a group of venture capitalists including the co-owners of Valentino's Pizza, based in Lincoln, Nebraska.

== Features ==
The arcade has more than 170 video, token and prize-awarding games, including Mario Kart, skee ball, Dance Dance Revolution and a giant crane. Games are operated with a swipe of a card that is loaded with pre-purchased points. Tickets given by earning certain point amounts at select games can be redeemed for prizes, ranging from branded miniature yo-yos to bicycles.

Rides and attractions such as bumper cars, an electric go-cart racetrack, glow-in-the-dark mini-golf, a coaster-type ride and The Frog-Hopper are also located in the arcade. The new Amazing Quest Laser Tag offers the opportunity to explore an alien planet and battle giant battle robots from another galaxy. In the summer of 2015, The Amazing Pizza Machine added four new games to their arcade.

The food at The Amazing Pizza Machine is served in an all-you-can-eat setting. Dining options include a pizza buffet, various pasta dishes, a salad and dessert bar and other food items. There are four themed dining rooms where patrons can eat. There is the newly incorporated Luigi's Libations, a small stop for beer and wine, also in the buffet area. The fare has been labelled "kid-pleasing" by the Omaha World-Herald.

== Awards ==
In November 2007, The Amazing Pizza Machine was one of three facilities to win the Top Family Entertainment Centers of the World awards from The International Association of Amusement Parks and Attractions. The facility was awarded the "Golden Token Award" for Best Family Entertainment Center from the International Association for the Leisure and Entertainment Industry in September 2006.

The business also received the Omaha Magazine's "Best of Omaha Award" in the family entertainment category every year since opening (2006-2014).

== See also ==
- Culture in Omaha, Nebraska
