= Trails in Omaha =

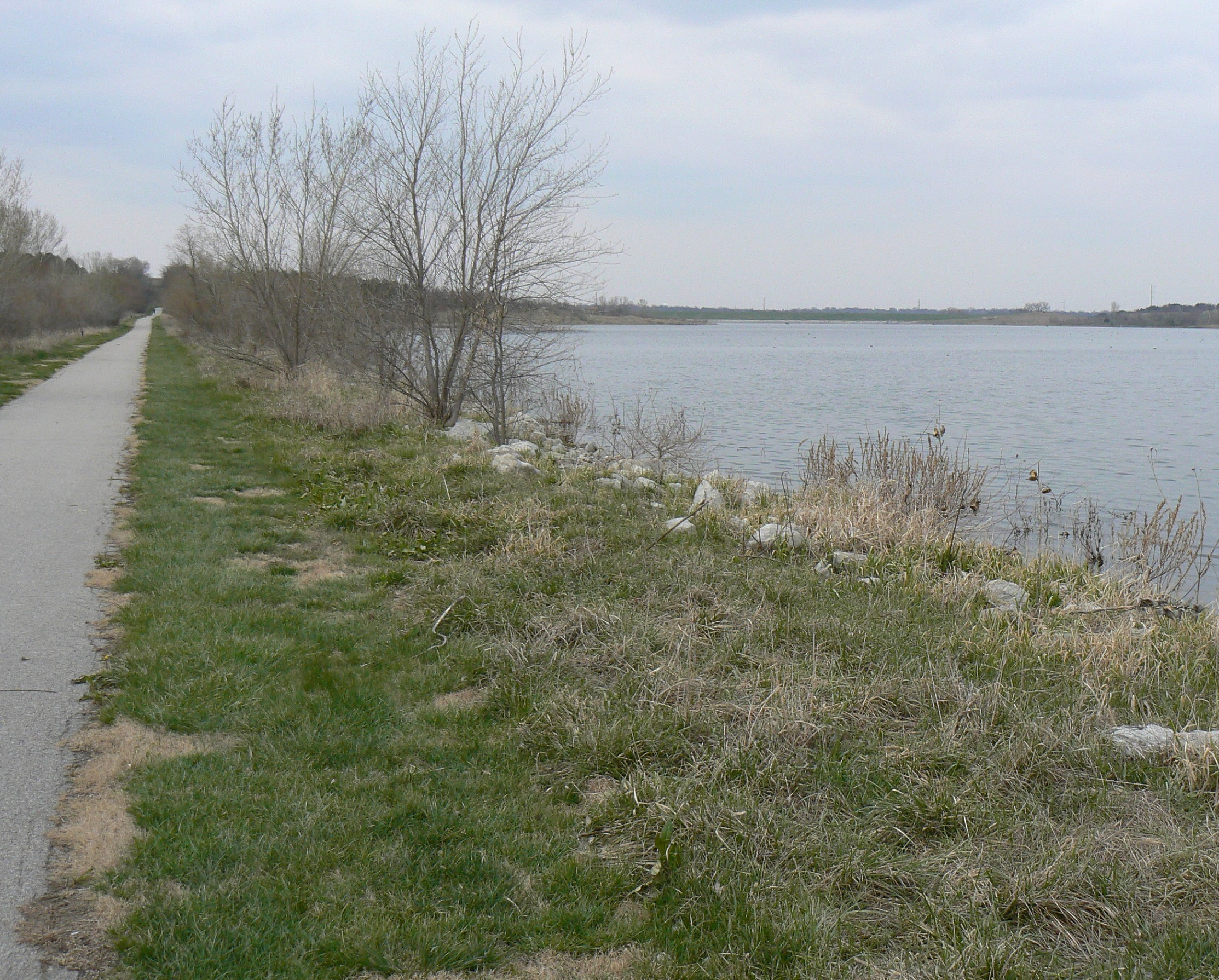
Wehrspann Lake Trail at the Chalco Hills Recreation Area in southwest Omaha.

Trails in Omaha, Nebraska include 80 miles (130 km) of paved trails as well as unpaved trails and paths for recreational usage throughout the city. Popular among bicyclists, runners, hikers and recreational walkers, these trails are included in comprehensive plans for the City of Omaha, the Omaha metro area, Douglas County, and long-distance coordinated plans between the municipalities of southeast Nebraska.

== History ==
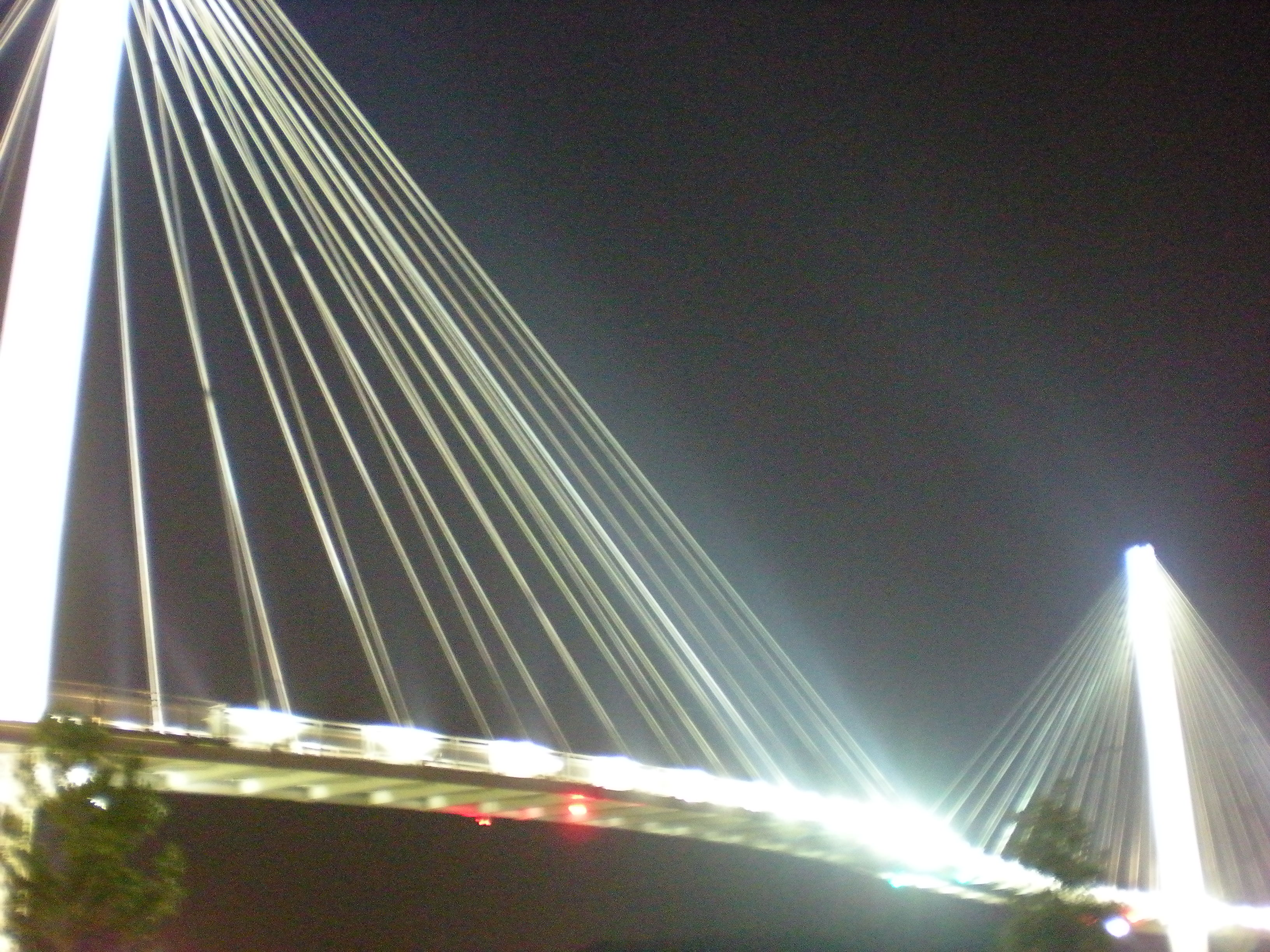
The Bob Kerrey Pedestrian Bridge connects the trails of Nebraska and Iowa.

In 1887 the Omaha Bicycling Club was responsible for expanding Athletic Park at North 20th and Lake Streets to include a bicycle racing track, and there were other early trails throughout the city. However, Omaha was completely devoid of trails for several years during the 20th century leading up to early 1989. That year the city began developing the Keystone trail, and since then the city of Omaha has developed approximately 67 miles (108 km) of paved recreational trails, and another 35 miles (56 km) of trails are scheduled for completion within the next eight years.

On September 28, 2008, the trails in Omaha were connected to trails in Council Bluffs, Iowa by way of the new Bob Kerrey Pedestrian Bridge. A 15- to 20-foot (6.1 m) wide S-shaped bridge spans more than 3,000 ft (910 m) across the Missouri River, connecting Omaha's Riverfront Trail with Playland Park in Council Bluffs.

== Benefits of the trails ==
A recent study focused on the benefits of Omaha's trails found that respondents generally perceive the trails to be economic benefits, with almost two-thirds of those surveyed reporting the trails would increase the selling price of their home. There is no widespread concern for safety issues on the trails, as trespassing, theft and vandalism by trail users are relatively infrequent events. A large majority of residents living along the trails think there is a positive relationship between the trails and neighborhood quality of life.

== Future development ==
There are many plans for the trails in Omaha. A local organization is calling for more east-west connecting trails, as most of the city east of 72nd Street has few trails of note. There are also plans to connect Omaha to the MoPac Trail running east from Lincoln on a system called the Mo-Pac East Trail. Currently extending northeast towards over the Platte River on the Lied Platte River Trail Bridge near South Bend, the trail will eventually connect with the 144th Street Trail.

The trails are also included in a plan called the Quad State Trail Project. This plan envisions linking numerous cities in Nebraska, Iowa, Kansas and Missouri, including connecting Omaha to St. Louis, Kansas City, Topeka and Lincoln via 700 miles (1,100 km) of trails, 450 of which already exist.

== Trails ==
Trails in Omaha alphabetical order
Name	Notes
144th Street Trail	Begins at Standing Bear Lake near Ida Street and connects with the Mopac Trail at Hwy. 50 and Hwy. 370.
American Discovery Trail	The ADT enters Omaha via the South Omaha Bridge and follows the Omaha Riverfront South Trail to Haworth Park in Bellevue. There it connects to the Keystone Bellevue Loop, Papio, West Papio, and 144th Street Trails.
Big Papio Trail	Follows the Papillion Creek 10 miles (16 km) to intersect with Keystone Trail.
Field Club Trail	1.72-mile (2.77 km) trail from Leavenworth Avenue to Vinton Street through the Field Club neighborhood.
Fontenelle Forest Nature Center	26 miles (42 km) of trails through oak savanna, prairie, and wetlands at 1111 North Bellevue Boulevard in Bellevue.
Keystone Trail	Runs south-north from North 90th and Fort Streets past the College of Saint Mary, connecting with the West Papio trail near South 36th Street and ending at Highway 75 in Bellevue. The trail then loops northward towards Haworth Park in Bellevue.
Lewis and Clark National Historic Trail	Headquartered at 601 Riverfront Drive on the Missouri River in NoDo, this trail extends 3,700 miles (6,000 km) through several western states.
Military Road Trail	Runs east-west from the intersection of North 90th Street and Sorenson Parkway to North 126th Street in Irvington.
Newport Landing Trail	Surrounds the Newport Landing housing development near Bennington.
Neale Woods Nature Center	554 acres (2.24 km^{2}) of floodplain and upland woodlands and restored prairie north of Omaha.
Omaha Riverfront North Trail	Runs south-north from the Omaha Public Power District plant at the northern end of Florence Boulevard underneath the Mormon Bridge to end at Dodge Park.
Omaha Riverfront South Trail	Runs north-south from Miller's Landing Park near Abbott Drive where the River City Star riverboat docks. It flows along the Missouri River, passing by The Gallup Organization’s operational headquarters, the National Park Service Midwestern headquarters, Rick's Boatyard Café, the Riverfront Condos, and Omaha Qwest Center and Arena.
Q Street Bike Path	Runs east-west from Millard Avenue to South 168th Street, connecting to the 144th Street Trail along the way.
Sorenson Parkway Trail	Runs east-west from North 30th Street to North 90th Street along Sorenson Parkway.
Standing Bear Lake Trail	A loop trail around Standing Bear Lake.
South Omaha Trail	Runs east-west from the Keystone trail to the Field Club
Swanson Park	Located in Bellevue at Cornhusker Road between 25th and 36th Streets, this mountain bike trail includes 6 miles (9.7 km) of singletrack.
Tranquility Park	Omaha's first approved off-road trail system in a city park is located at 12550 West Maple Road.
Turner Boulevard	A 1.4 miles (2.3 km) in-town trail that links the Field Club Trail at Pacific Street to Turner Park near Farnam Street via several midtown neighborhoods. The trail runs through Leavenworth Park, Bend Park, Dewey Park and terminates at Turner Park.
Walnut Creek Trail	A trail around the lake at the Walnut Creek Recreation Area under management of the Papio-Missouri River Natural Resource District, it connects with the West Papio Trail.
Walnut Grove Trail	In a small park near South 153rd and Q Streets, this trail connects to both the Zorinsky Lake Trail and the Q Street bike path.
Wehrspann Lake Trail	Located in the Chalco Hills Recreation Area, this trail includes Wehrspann Lake and the headquarters for the Papio-Missouri River Natural Resource District, and ties into the 144th Street Trail
Westin Hills Trail	Runs east-west from North 144th to North 156th Street, starting near the intersection of West Maple Road and Fort Street. Connects the 144th Street Trail to the West Papio Trail.
West Papio North Trail	Runs north-south from North 156th and West Maple Road, continuing south to Oakbrook Meadows Park. There the trail tees, going west to Zorinsky Lake, and east to the 144th Street Trail.
West Papio South Trail	Starting on West Lincoln Street near Highway 85/Washington Street, the trail runs west-east to connect with the Keystone Trail.
Zorinsky Lake Trail	Located at South 168th Street south of Center Street.

== See also ==
- Parks in Omaha
- Omaha Belt Line

== Bibliography ==
- Greer, D.L. (2000) Omaha Recreational Trails: Their Effect on Property Values and Public Safety. University of Nebraska at Omaha. Retrieved 9/20/07.
- RDG Martin Shukert and Ciaccio Dennell Group. (1994) A Network of Discovery: A Comprehensive Trails Plan for the State of Nebraska. Nebraska Energy Office and the Nebraska Department of Economic Development.
