= Bob Kerrey Pedestrian Bridge =

Footbridge across Omaha, Nebraska to Council Bluffs, Iowa, U.S.

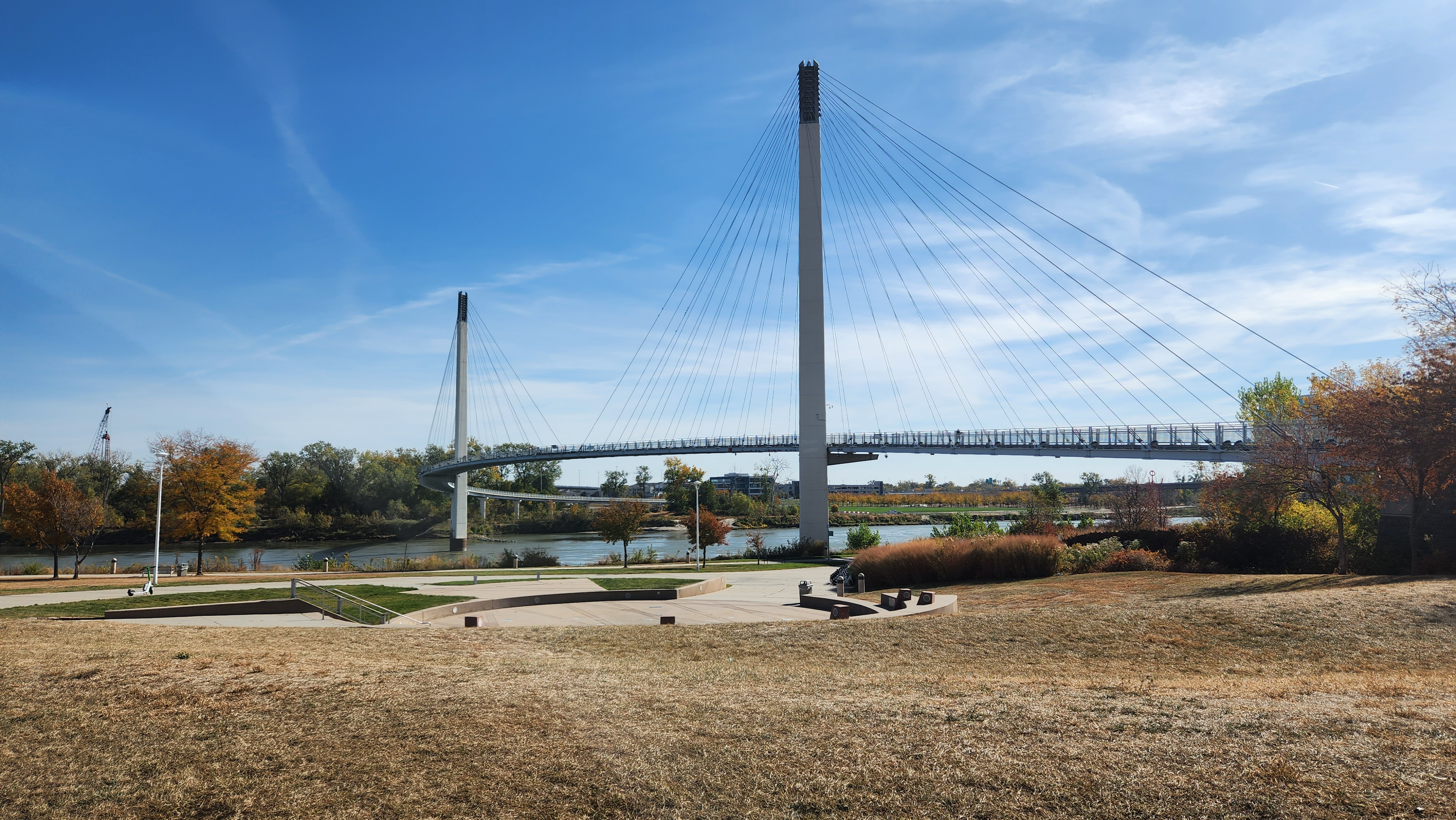
- The bridge in 2024
- Coordinates: 41.26563°N 95.92231°W
- Carries: Pedestrian and bicycle traffic
- Crosses: Missouri River
- Locale: Omaha, Nebraska; Council Bluffs, Iowa
- Named for: Bob Kerrey
- Preceded by: Illinois Central Missouri River Bridge
- Followed by: Grenville Dodge Memorial Bridge

Characteristics
- Design: Cable-stayed
- Total length: 3,000 ft (910 m)
- Longest span: 506 ft (154 m)
- Clearance below: 52 ft (16 m)

History
- Designer: Ted Zoli
- Contracted lead designer: HNTB
- Opened: September 28, 2008

Statistics
- Toll: No

Location
- Interactive map of Bob Kerrey Pedestrian Bridge

The Bob Kerrey Pedestrian Bridge, also called Bob the Bridge, is a footbridge across the Missouri River between Omaha, Nebraska and Council Bluffs, Iowa, United States. It opened in 2008, and is named after former Nebraska Senator Bob Kerrey, who secured federal funding for the bridge.

== History ==
With the replacement of the Ak-Sar-Ben Bridge and other older crossings across the Missouri River, interest in a pedestrian bridge crossing the river from Omaha, Nebraska to Council Bluffs, Iowa came into discussion. The Bob Kerrey Pedestrian Bridge began development in 1998 as a part of the Back to the River steering committee, which involved the cities of Omaha, Council Bluffs, the Iowa Department of Transportation, the Nebraska Department of Roads, and the Papio-Missouri River Natural Resources District.

In October 1999, Senator Bob Kerrey created a transportation bill to help give funding to the pedestrian bridge. The bill secured $18 million of federal funding for the bridge in 2000. The bridge was redesigned in 2004 after the lowest bid for the project was $44 million. In May 2006, a final cable-stayed bridge design by Kansas City engineering and architectural firm HNTB was selected for the bridge. The $22 million bid included two 200-foot (61 m) towers and a clearance of 52 feet (16 m) above the river. Groundbreaking for construction of the bridge occurred on October 26, 2006.

Both the Council Bluffs and Omaha city councils voted to name the pedestrian bridge for Bob Kerrey ahead of its opening in September 2008. The Bob Kerrey Pedestrian Bridge officially opened on September 28, 2008. Due to safety concerns prompted by the 2011 Missouri River floods, the entrance on the Iowa side was closed on July 2 of that year. It reopened September 3, 2011. In 2015, as a part of a marketing campaign by the Omaha Convention & Visitors Bureau, the Bob Kerrey Pedestrian Bridge was given an online persona known as Bob the Bridge. Additionally, Bob the Bridge joined Twitter, and posts videos using the persona.

In November 2023, a $7.5 million dollar expansion bridge, named Baby Bob, was announced. Groundwork began shortly after announcement and RiverFront Drive closed for construction. The expansion opened on March 21, 2025.

== Design ==
The bridge is a 3,000-foot (910 m) cable-stayed footbridge. The bridge is north of the Interstate 480 (I-480) girder bridge and connects the Omaha RiverFront to Tom Hanafan River's Edge Park in the former Dodge Park Playland in Council Bluffs.

== Gallery ==
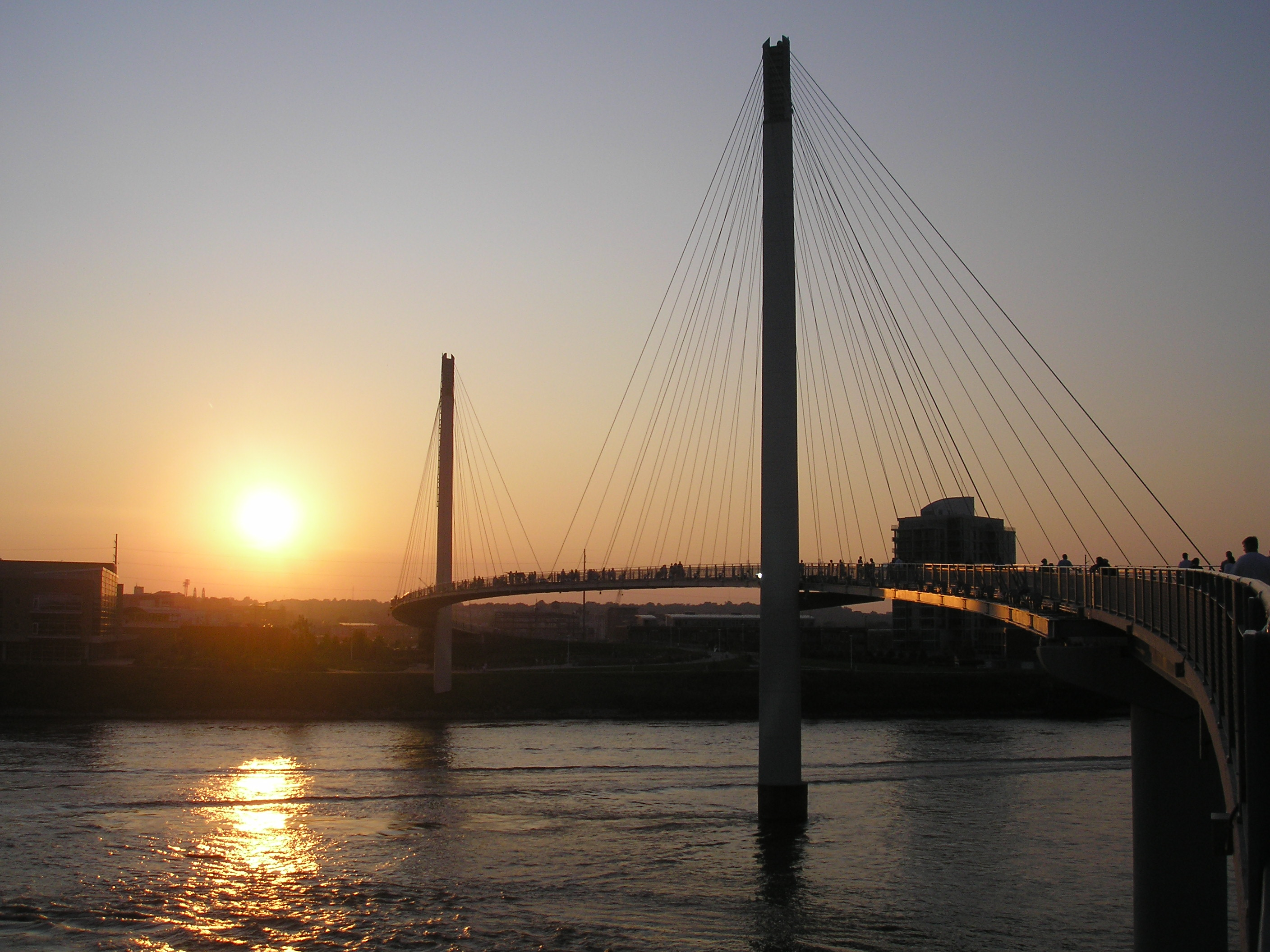
At sunset from the Iowa side in or prior to 2011

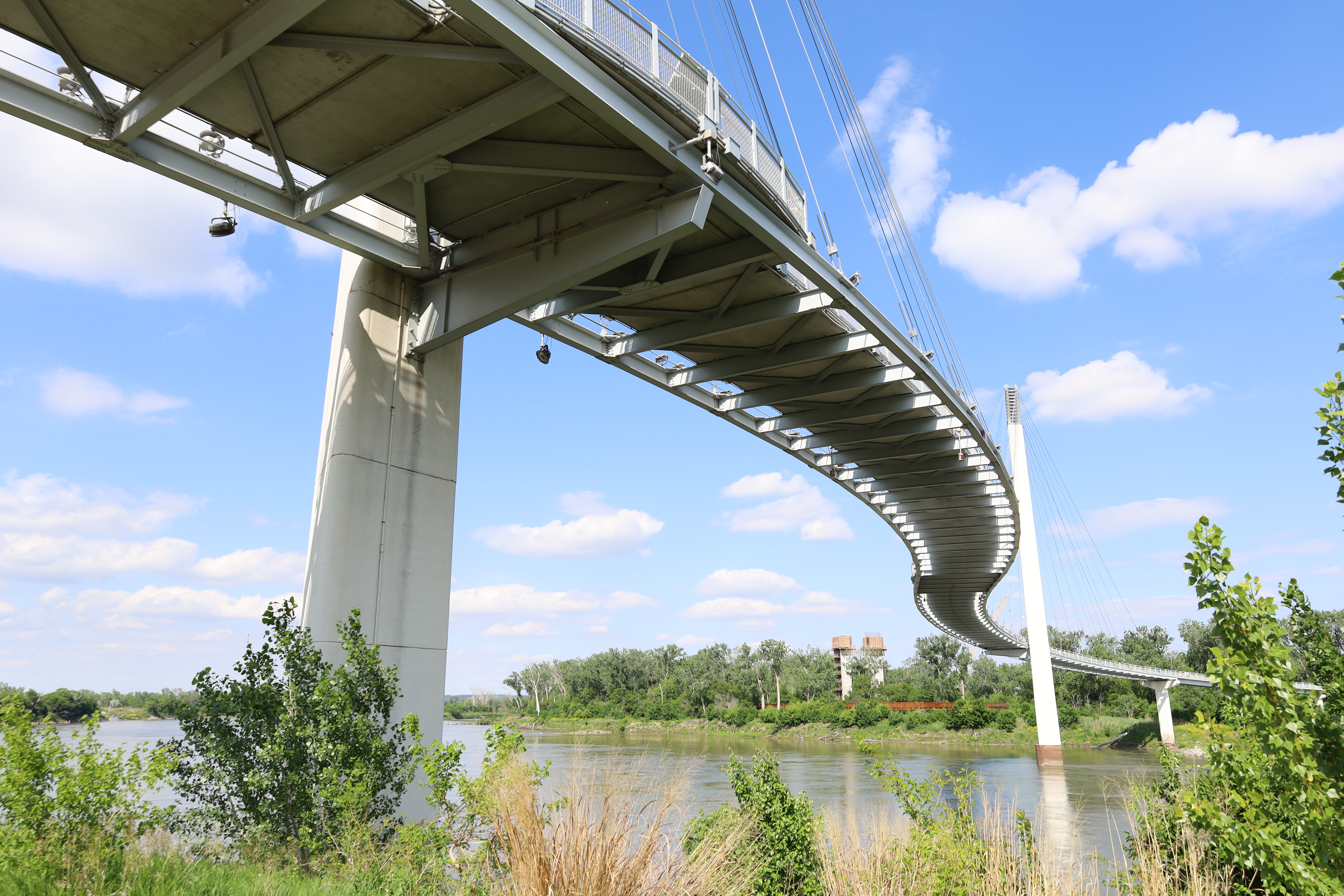
Underside in 2025

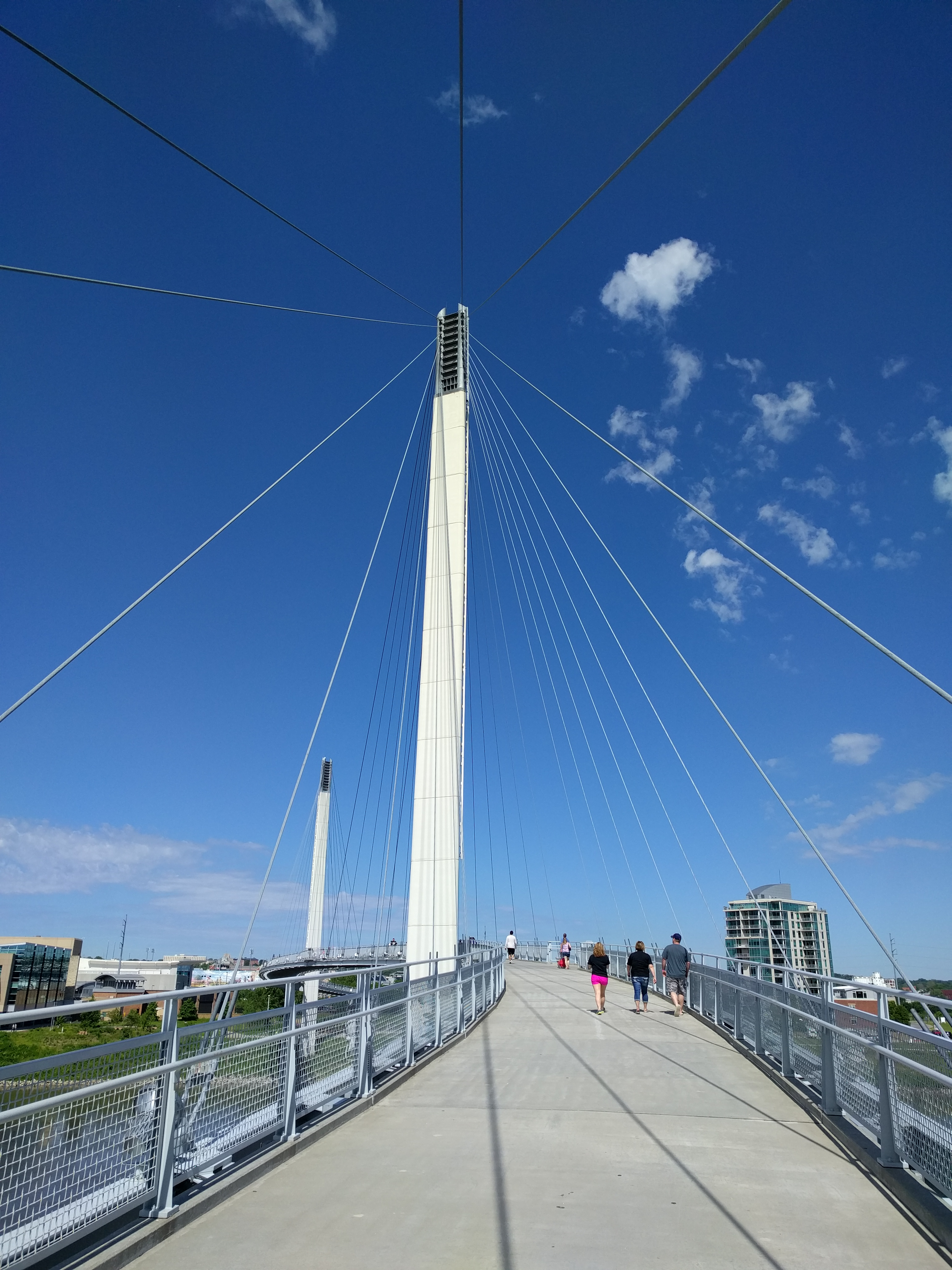
Deck in 2016

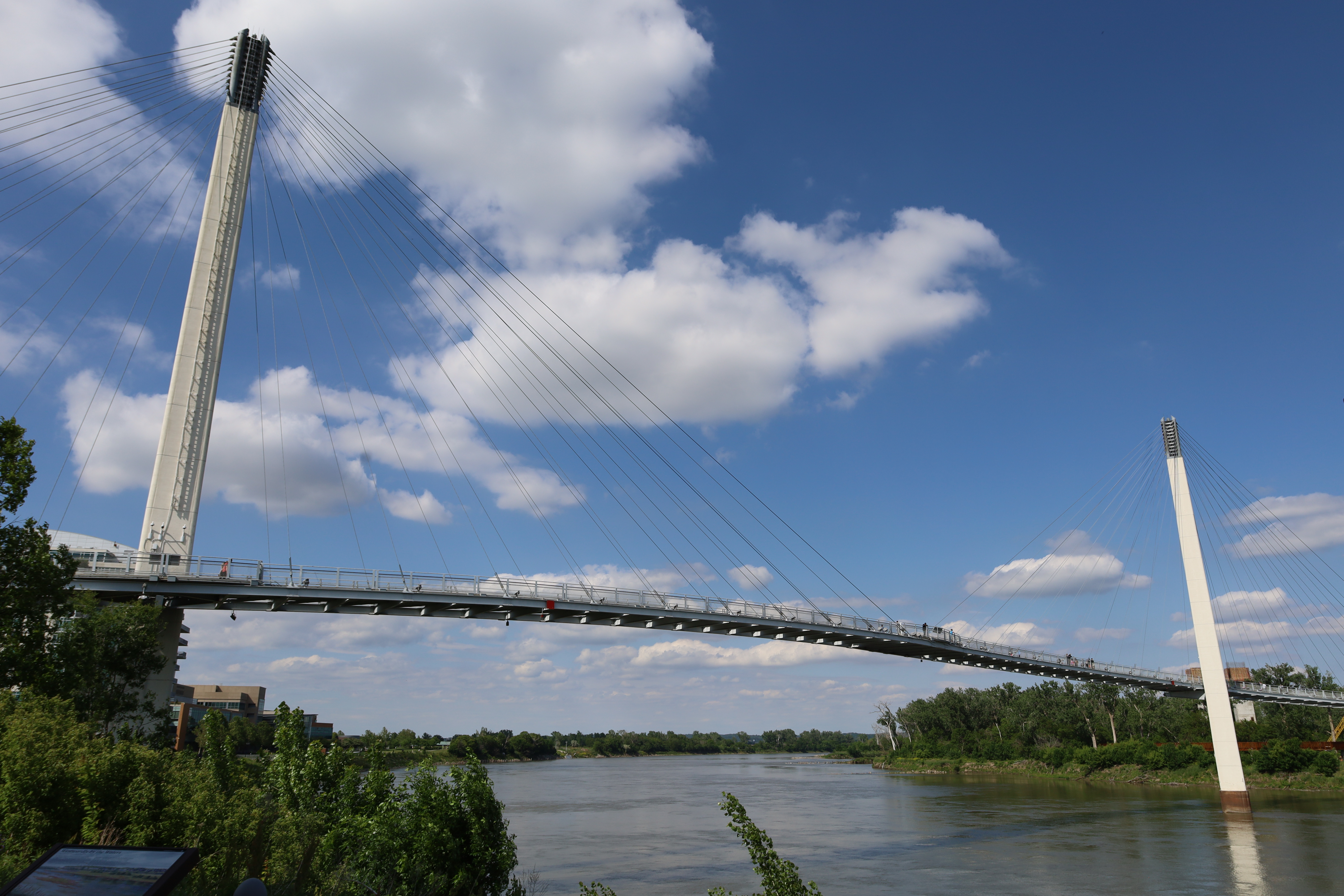
View of the bridge in 2025

== See also ==
- Trails in Omaha
- List of crossings of the Missouri River
- Parks in Omaha
