= Wabash, Nebraska =

- Unincorporated community
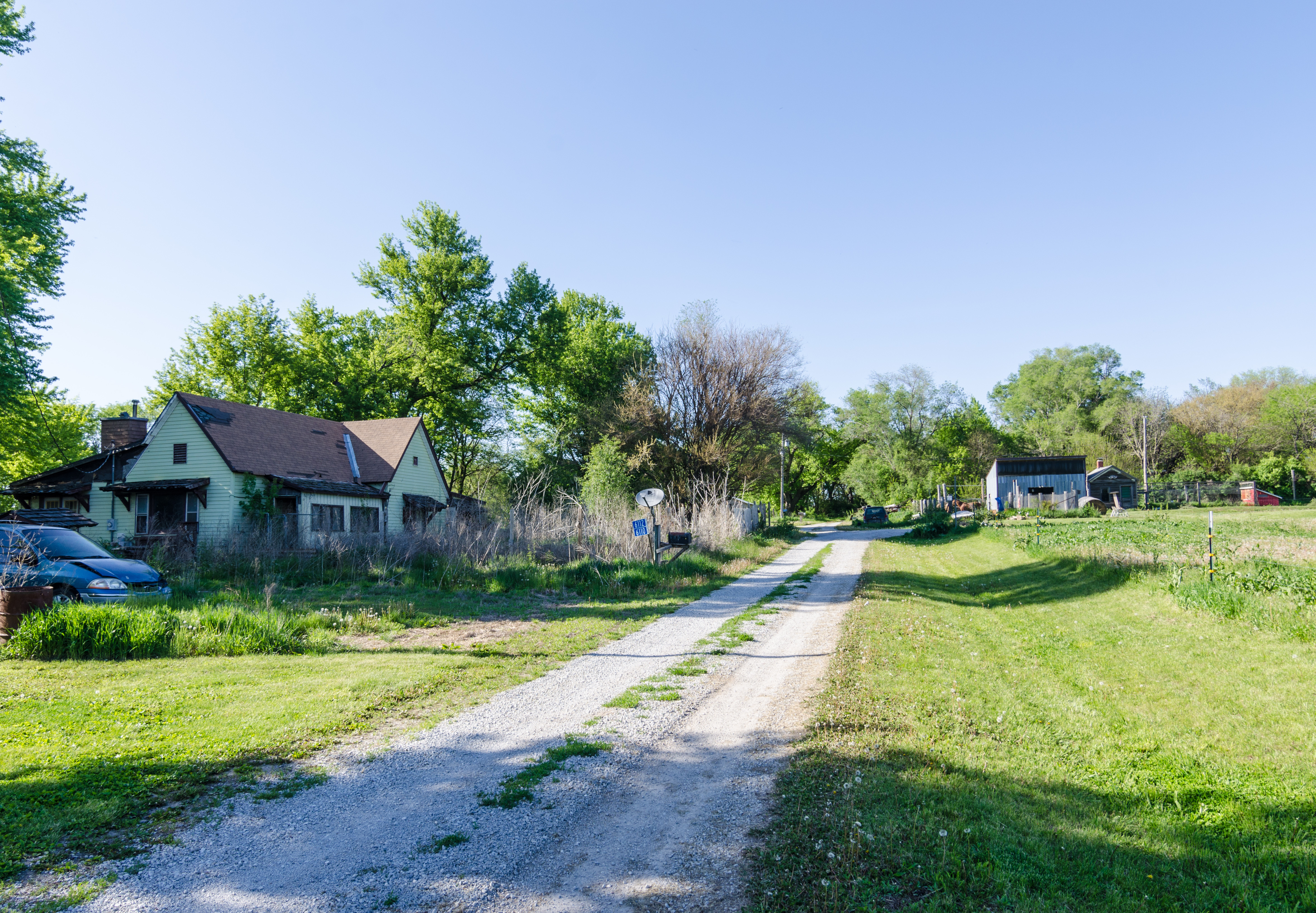
- North on Elm Street

- Location within the state of Nebraska
- Coordinates: 40°53′10″N 96°15′20″W
- Country: United States
- State: Nebraska
- County: Cass
- Elevation: 1,290 ft (390 m)
- Time zone: UTC-6 (Central (CST))
  - Summer (DST): UTC-5 (CDT)

Wabash is an unincorporated community in Cass County, Nebraska, United States.

== History ==
A large share of the early settlers being natives of Indiana caused the name Wabash, after Wabash, Indiana, to be selected. A post office was established at Wabash in 1886, and remained in operation until it was discontinued in 1965.
