= Valentino's =

American Italian restaurant chain in Nebraska

- Company type: Private
- Industry: Food
- Founded: 1957; 69 years ago
- Headquarters: Lincoln, Nebraska
- Website: valentinos.com

Valentino's is a regional Italian restaurant chain based in Lincoln, Nebraska. Valentino's was founded by the Gates family in 1957. The restaurant was purchased by two Lincoln families in 1971 and began franchising additional locations. The first carry-out store opened in 1990, and many of the full-scale restaurants converted to the buffet concept in the early-2000s.

As of 2026, Valentino's has 31 locations in Nebraska, 1 location in Kansas, and 1 location in South Dakota.

== Subsidiaries ==
Opened a pizza by the slice business in 1982 and expanded that to 45 units before selling it in 1985.
