= South Bend, Nebraska =

- Village
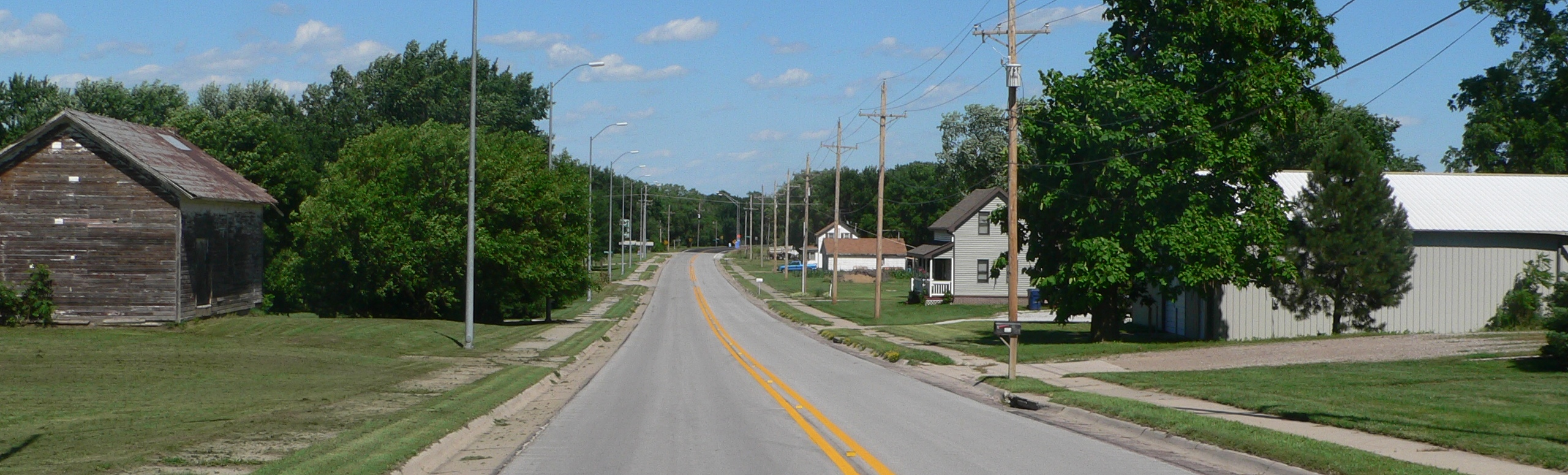
- South Bend, seen from the west along Nebraska Highway 66

- Location of South Bend, Nebraska
- Coordinates: 41°00′06″N 96°15′03″W
- Country: United States
- State: Nebraska
- County: Cass

Area
  - Total: 0.14 sq mi (0.35 km^{2})
  - Land: 0.14 sq mi (0.35 km^{2})
  - Water: 0 sq mi (0.00 km^{2})
- Elevation: 1,043 ft (318 m)

Population (2020)
  - Total: 92
  - Density: 687.8/sq mi (265.57/km^{2})
- Time zone: UTC-6 (Central (CST))
  - Summer (DST): UTC-5 (CDT)
- ZIP code: 68058
- Area code: 402
- FIPS code: 31-45680
- GNIS feature ID: 2399842
- Website: southbendnebraska.com

South Bend is a village in Cass County, Nebraska, United States. The population was 92 at the 2020 census. The main landmark is a pedestrian bridge across the Platte River which leads to Schramm Park State Recreation Area. It was built in 2004 on the pillars of the abandoned Rock Island Railroad bridge. Thirty-five trains a day—most of them coal trains—still pass through the area on the BNSF Railway main.

== History ==
The first permanent settlement at South Bend was made in 1856. South Bend was platted in 1857. The town was named from a meander in the Platte River.

== Geography ==
According to the United States Census Bureau, the village has a total area of 0.13 square miles (0.34 km^{2}), all land.

== Demographics ==
Historical population
| Census | Pop. | Note | %± |
|---|---|---|---|
| 1880 | 232 | | — |
| 1890 | 132 | | −43.1% |
| 1900 | 141 | | 6.8% |
| 1910 | 125 | | −11.3% |
| 1920 | 143 | | 14.4% |
| 1930 | 99 | | −30.8% |
| 1940 | 100 | | 1.0% |
| 1950 | 100 | | 0.0% |
| 1960 | 86 | | −14.0% |
| 1970 | 86 | | 0.0% |
| 1980 | 107 | | 24.4% |
| 1990 | 93 | | −13.1% |
| 2000 | 86 | | −7.5% |
| 2010 | 99 | | 15.1% |
| 2020 | 92 | | −7.1% |
U.S. Decennial Census

=== 2010 census ===
As of the census of 2010, there were 99 people, 41 households, and 28 families living in the village. The population density was 761.5 inhabitants per square mile (294.0/km^{2}). There were 47 housing units at an average density of 361.5 per square mile (139.6/km^{2}). The racial makeup of the village was 97.0% White and 3.0% from two or more races.

There were 41 households, of which 22.0% had children under the age of 18 living with them, 61.0% were married couples living together, 7.3% had a female householder with no husband present, and 31.7% were non-families. 19.5% of all households were made up of individuals, and 2.4% had someone living alone who was 65 years of age or older. The average household size was 2.41 and the average family size was 2.82.

The median age in the village was 44.8 years. 17.2% of residents were under the age of 18; 7% were between the ages of 18 and 24; 26.3% were from 25 to 44; 30.3% were from 45 to 64; and 19.2% were 65 years of age or older. The gender makeup of the village was 50.5% male and 49.5% female.

=== 2000 census ===
As of the census of 2000, there were 86 people, 34 households, and 26 families living in the village. The population density was 698.0 inhabitants per square mile (269.5/km^{2}). There were 38 housing units at an average density of 308.4 per square mile (119.1/km^{2}). The racial makeup of the village was 91.86% White and 8.14% from two or more races. Hispanic or Latino of any race were 2.33% of the population.

There were 34 households, out of which 29.4% had children under the age of 18 living with them, 67.6% were married couples living together, 8.8% had a female householder with no husband present, and 23.5% were non-families. 14.7% of all households were made up of individuals, and none had someone living alone who was 65 years of age or older. The average household size was 2.53 and the average family size was 2.73.

In the village, the population was spread out, with 26.7% under the age of 18, 1.2% from 18 to 24, 32.6% from 25 to 44, 32.6% from 45 to 64, and 7.0% who were 65 years of age or older. The median age was 37 years. For every 100 females, there were 120.5 males. For every 100 females age 18 and over, there were 103.2 males.

As of 2000 the median income for a household in the village was $38,750, and the median income for a family was $34,583. Males had a median income of $37,917 versus $23,750 for females. The per capita income for the village was $17,105. There were 14.8% of families and 23.4% of the population living below the poverty line, including 77.8% of under eighteens and none of those over 64.
