= Dodge Park Playland =

It was in operation from 1948 to 1970

- Location: Council Bluffs, Iowa
- Coordinates: 41.262°N 95.916°W
- Opened: 1948
- Closed: 1970
- Owner: Abe and Louis Slusky

Dodge Park Playland was an amusement park formerly located at Council Bluffs, Iowa, United States. It was in operation from 1948 to 1970. In its heyday as an amusement park, through the 1960's, it spanned the street in Council Bluffs that began from the old bridge in Omaha across the Missouri river. It had a large wooden roller coaster, food stands, games of chance, rides like "bumper cars" and "tilt-a-whirl", as well as children's rides. The park eventually had to give up the land on the south side of the street to make room for road and bridge changes. [1,2,3,4]. It was also known as Playland Speedway and aerial images exist of the park and track. [5].

== History ==
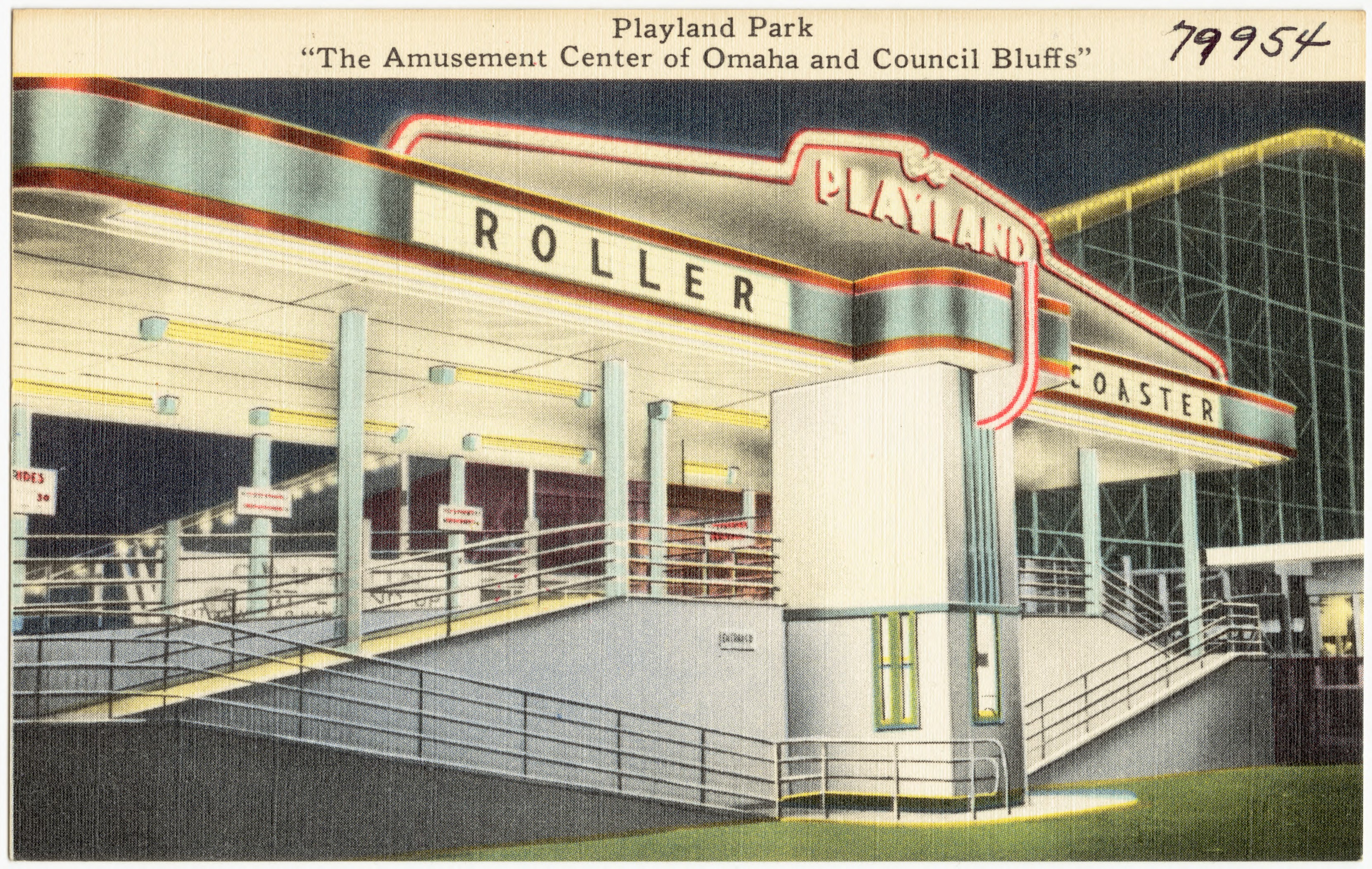
Early postcard image

The Playland Speedway was originally a dog racing track formed in 1941, but was shut down in 1943. The dog-racing track was operated by Meyer Lansky. In 1947, the track was rebuilt as a dirt track and in 1948 Abe and Louis Slusky brought an amusement park to the grounds. The Dodge Park Playland operated until 1970 when Abe Slusky died of a heart attack and the rides were moved to Frontier City, another amusement park owned by the brothers. The racetrack continued until 1977, when it was shut down. The area is now parkland and the eastern entrance to the Bob Kerrey Pedestrian Bridge.
