= Fontenelle Forest =

- Fontenelle Forest Historic District
- U.S. National Register of Historic Places
- U.S. Historic district
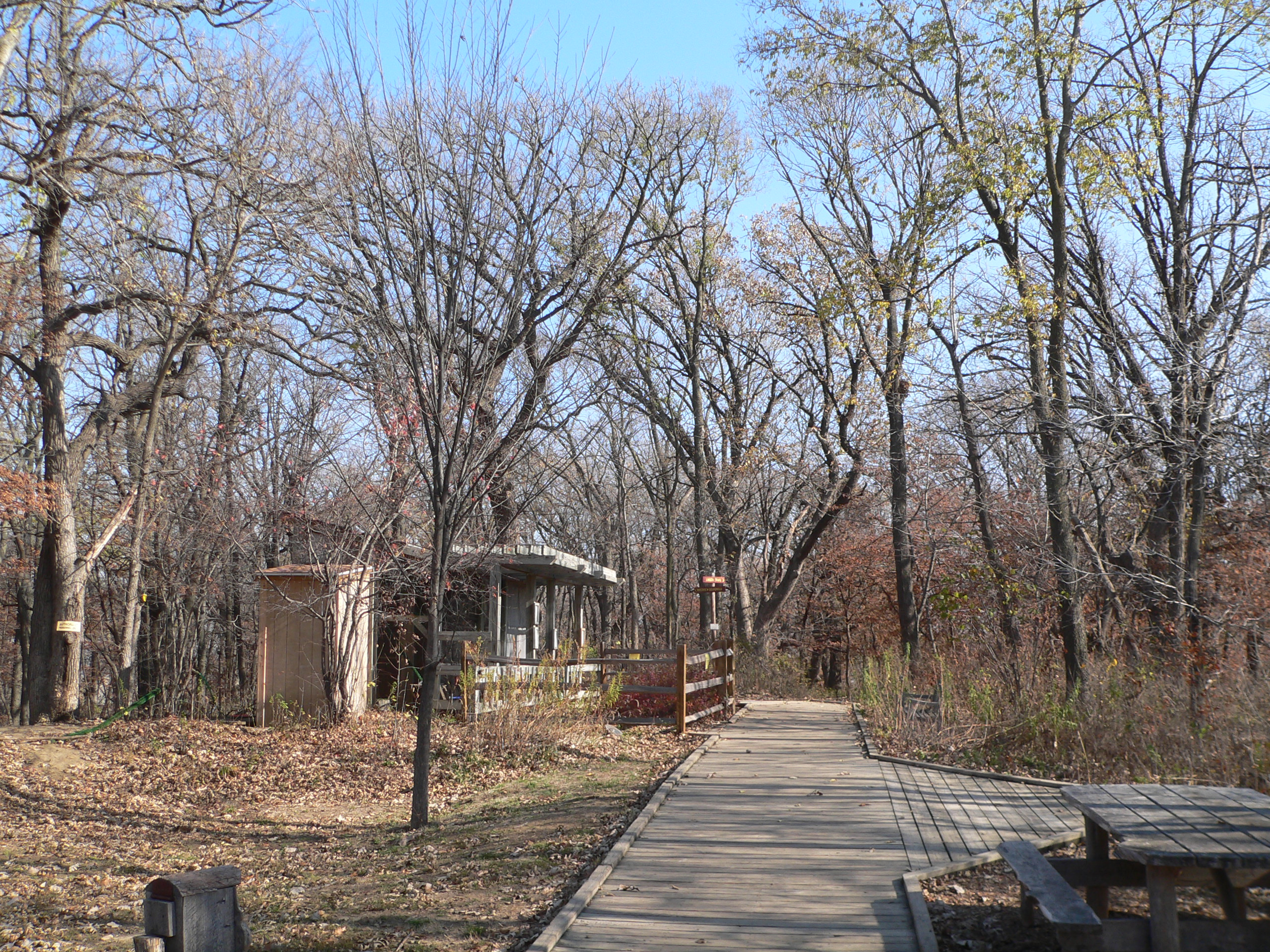
- Boardwalk trail on upper level of Fontenelle Forest, near visitor center

- Location within Nebraska
- Location: Bellevue, Nebraska
- Coordinates: 41°10′48″N 95°55′4″W
- NRHP reference No.: 74001139
- Added to NRHP: January 21, 1974

Fontenelle Forest is a 1,500-acre (6 km^{2}) forest, located in Bellevue, Nebraska. Its visitor features include hiking trails, a nature center, children's camps, a gift shop, and picnic facilities. The forest is listed as a National Natural Landmark and a National Historic District. The forest includes hardwood deciduous forest, extensive floodplain, loess hills, and marshlands.

== History ==
After settlement by Woodland culture Indians for a thousand years prior to the arrival of whites, the Lewis and Clark Expedition camped near or at the location of the forest on July 27, 1804.

Joshua Pilcher founded a trading post near Fontenelle Forest's great marsh for the Missouri Fur Company in 1823. This was at the edge of the territory of the Omaha and Otoe peoples. The French-American trader Lucien Fontenelle, from New Orleans, later bought the post from Pilcher, and it became known as Fontenelle's Post.

With the declining fur trade, he sold the post to the federal government in 1832, which used it to house the Bellevue Indian Agency. After Fontenelle's death in 1840, his oldest son Logan Fontenelle returned to Nebraska from school in St. Louis. Tri-lingual and of mixed race, the younger Fontenelle started working at age 15 as an interpreter for the US Indian agent at the Agency. His mother was the daughter of the Omaha principal chief, Big Elk; and he spoke Omaha, English and French.

The younger Fontenelle participated as interpreter in negotiations for the Omaha cession of land in its 1854 treaty with the United States, and many European Americans in the late nineteenth and early twentieth centuries thought he was a chief. In 1919 the historian Melvin R. Gilmore wrote an article explaining the Omaha patrilineal gente system, which he believed prohibited Fontenelle as a chief because of his American father, as he was never adopted into the tribe. Because Fontenelle's father was a white man, the Omaha classified him as also white. Both father and son are buried in the forest, although the exact location is unknown.

Dr. A.A. Tyler and Dr. Harold Gifford, Sr. founded the Fontenelle Forest Association in 1913 with a mission to preserve the woodlands south of Omaha, Nebraska along the Missouri River. They bought their first preservation land in 1920. The association named the forest after Logan Fontenelle.

A small nature center was opened in 1966 for the popular educational hikes led by volunteers. In 2000, the Fontenelle Forest Association officially changed its name to Fontenelle Nature Association. In 2012, Fontenelle Nature Association changed its name back to Fontenelle Forest. Today, Fontenelle Forest keeps more than 2,000 acres of riparian forest, prairies, swamps, and other lands in preservation. The lands encompass one of the largest natural deciduous forests in Nebraska.

== Facilities ==
Fontenelle Forest includes several facilities. The Katherine and Fred Buffett Forest Learning Center is the main building in the forest. Built in 2000, it has space for school programs, public education events and private events. Two miles from the Learning Center was the Gilbert and Martha Hitchcock Wetlands Learning Center. It offered educational spaces adjacent to the Gifford Memorial Boardwalk, a 3/8-mile path that leads to a two-story observation tower overlooking the Great Marsh and was opened in 1999. The Wetlands Learning Center experienced significant structural damage during a flood in 2019. It was deemed beyond repair and torn down. It has not been replaced.

Fontenelle Forest also owns and operates Neale Woods, located north of Omaha.

== Wildlife ==
Situated along the Missouri River Valley flyway, Fontenelle Forest, the Audubon Society reports that "246 species [of birds] have been recorded, among them 35 species of warblers." Birder's World named the forest one of the top ten warbler viewing spots in the United States. Bird Watching magazine wrote that Fontenelle Forest is, "the single best place to see eastern birds near the western edge of their ranges and western birds near their eastern borders." It is the only place in Nebraska where red-shouldered hawks have nested, and one of the few known places in the state that support pileated woodpeckers. Other species of note seen in the forest include Kentucky, prothonotary, and cerulean warbler; wood thrush; grasshopper sparrow; and whip-poor-will.

== Fontenelle Forest bibliography ==
- Garabrandt, G.W. (1978) A history of land use in the oak-hickory woodland of Fontenelle Forest. University of Nebraska at Omaha.

== See also ==
- Trails in Omaha
- Tourism in Omaha, Nebraska
