= Papillion Creek =

Stream in Nebraska, U.S.

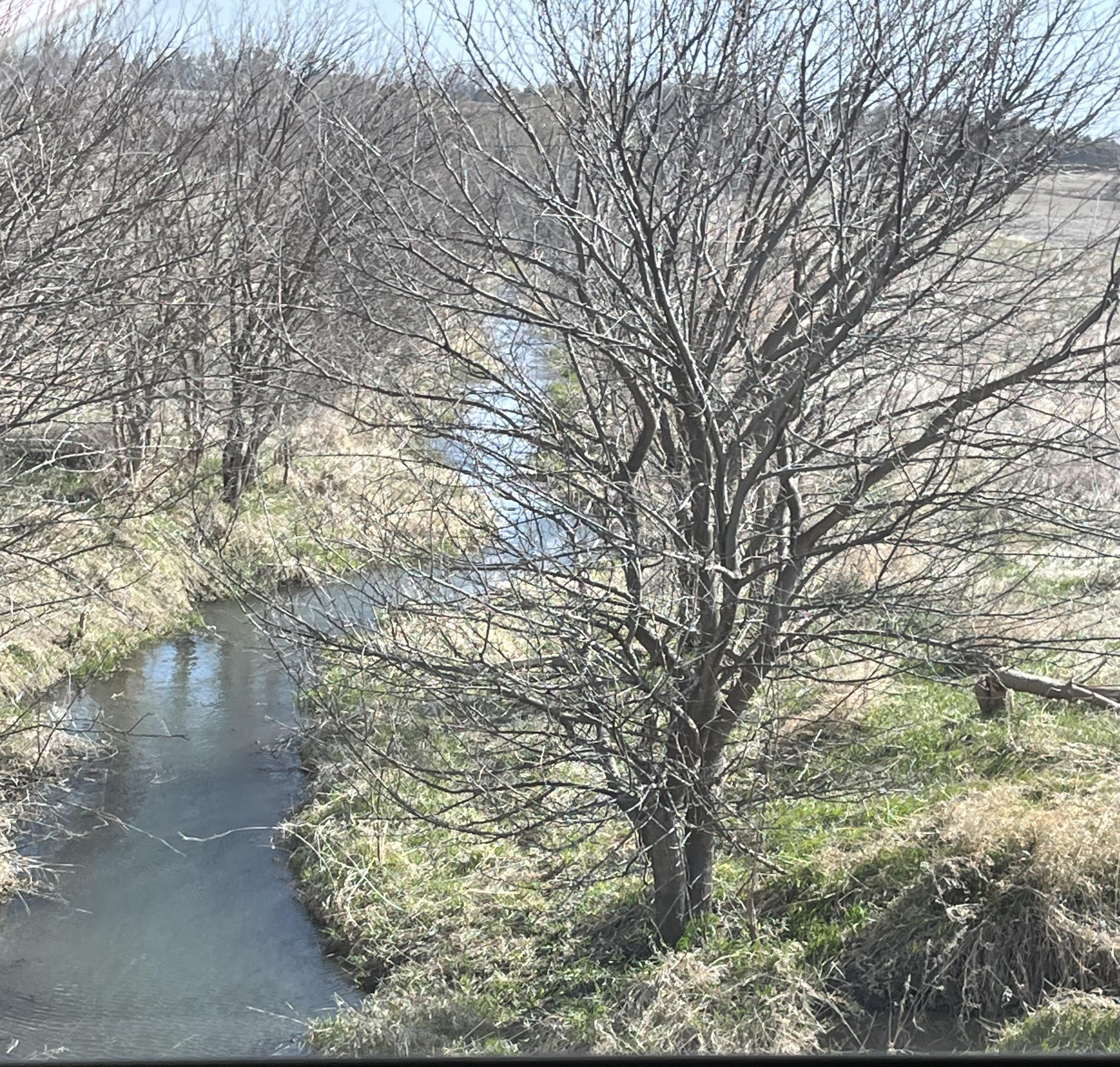
- West Papillion Creek

Location
- Country: United States
- State: Nebraska

Physical characteristics
- Mouth
  - location: Missouri River
  - coordinates: 41°04′33″N 95°52′20″W
- Length: 15.5 miles (24.9 km)

Papillion Creek is a 15.5-mile-long (24.9 km) tributary of the Missouri River in Nebraska. Its watershed lies in Washington, Douglas and Sarpy counties, including parts of the city of Omaha. The main branch of Papillion Creek is known as Big Papillion Creek. Some of the tributaries include Little Papillion Creek, Thomas Creek, Cole Creek, Northwest Branch of West Papillion Creek, West Papillion Creek, South Papillion Creek, and Mud Creek. Papillion Creek empties into the Missouri River south of Bellevue and just north of the mouth of the Platte River.

Locals often refer to the creek as the "Papio Creek".

Within its watershed lie Glenn Cunningham Lake, Standing Bear Lake, Zorinsky Lake and Wehrspann Lake at the Chalco Hills Recreation Area, which were created by the Army Corps of Engineers in the aftermath of extensive flooding in 1964 and 1965.

== See also ==
- List of rivers of Nebraska
- Tributaries of the Missouri River
