= Lane, Nebraska =

Former US settlement and railroad depot

Coordinates: 41°14′31″N 96°09′39″W

Lane was an unincorporated community located in what is now West Omaha in Douglas County, Nebraska, United States.

== History ==
Lane was a depot on the Union Pacific Railroad. The community was named for C. J. Lane, a railroad official.
