= Men of Boys Town =

1941 film by Norman Taurog

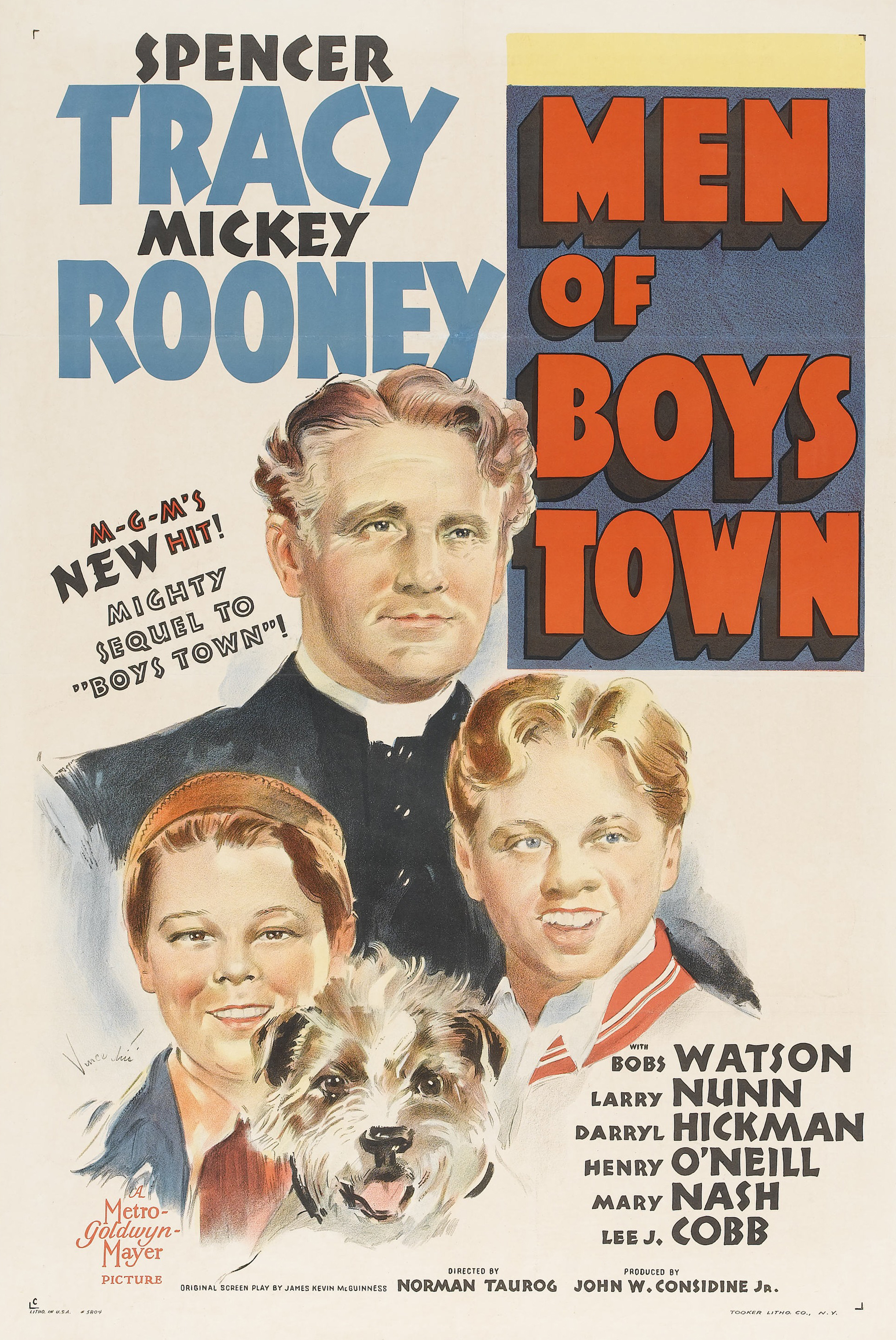
- Theatrical release poster
- Directed by: Norman Taurog
- Screenplay by: James Kevin McGuinness
- Based on: Life of Father Edward J. Flanagan and "Boys Town"
- Produced by: John W. Considine Jr.
- Starring: Spencer Tracy; Mickey Rooney; Bobs Watson; Larry Nunn; Darryl Hickman; Henry O'Neill
- Cinematography: Harold Rosson
- Edited by: Frederick Y. Smith; Ben Lewis
- Music by: Herbert Stothart
- Production company: Metro-Goldwyn-Mayer
- Distributed by: Loew's Inc.
- Release date: April 11, 1941
- Running time: 106 minutes
- Country: United States
- Language: English
- Budget: $862,000
- Box office: $3,166,000

Men of Boys Town is a 1941 American drama film directed by Norman Taurog and written by James Kevin McGuinness. It is a sequel to the 1938 film Boys Town. The film stars Spencer Tracy, Mickey Rooney, Bobs Watson, Larry Nunn, Darryl Hickman and Henry O'Neill. The film was released on April 11, 1941, by Metro-Goldwyn-Mayer.

== Plot ==
Mr. and Mrs. Maitland, a childless couple, invite Whitey to their home on a trial basis. Whitey tries to visit a friend in reform school and inmate Flip is hiding in a car as Whitey leaves. Flip steals money and both boys go to reform school. (This is where the movie takes a darker tone as it depicts, using indirect camera angles, the physical abuse the boys suffer in detention at the facility). Father Flanagan exposes the conditions in the school and the boys are released to him. The Maitlands work to pay off the debts threatening Boys Town.

== Cast ==
- Spencer Tracy as Father Flanagan
- Mickey Rooney as Whitey Marsh
- Bobs Watson as Pee Wee
- Larry Nunn as Ted Martley
- Darryl Hickman as Flip
- Henry O'Neill as Mr. Maitland
- Mary Nash as Mrs. Maitland
- Lee J. Cobb as Dave Morris
- Sidney Miller as Mo Kahn
- Addison Richards as The Judge
- Lloyd Corrigan as Roger Gorton
- George Lessey as Bradford Stone
- Robert Emmett Keane as Burton
- Arthur Hohl as Guard
- Ben Welden as Superintendent
- Anne Revere as Mrs. Fenely
- Wade Boteler as Police Lieutenant (uncredited)
- Frank Coghlan Jr. as Frank (uncredited)
- Charles Smith as Slim

== Reception ==
Critics singled out Darryl Hickman's performance, saying his juvenile delinquent character was "almost running away with Men of Boys Town right under Mickey Rooney's nose". The film was a hit and became the ninth most popular film at the United States box office in 1941. According to MGM records the film earned $2,009,000 in the US and Canada and $1,157,000 elsewhere resulting in a profit of $1,269,000.
