= Elk City =

Elk City may refer to:

Places in the United States:

- Elk City, Idaho
- Elk City, Kansas
- Elk City, Nebraska
- Elk City, Oklahoma
- Elk City, West Virginia

In music:

- Elk City (band), an American art pop band
