= Edward J. Flanagan =

Irish-born American priest (1886–1948)

Venerable Edward Joseph Flanagan
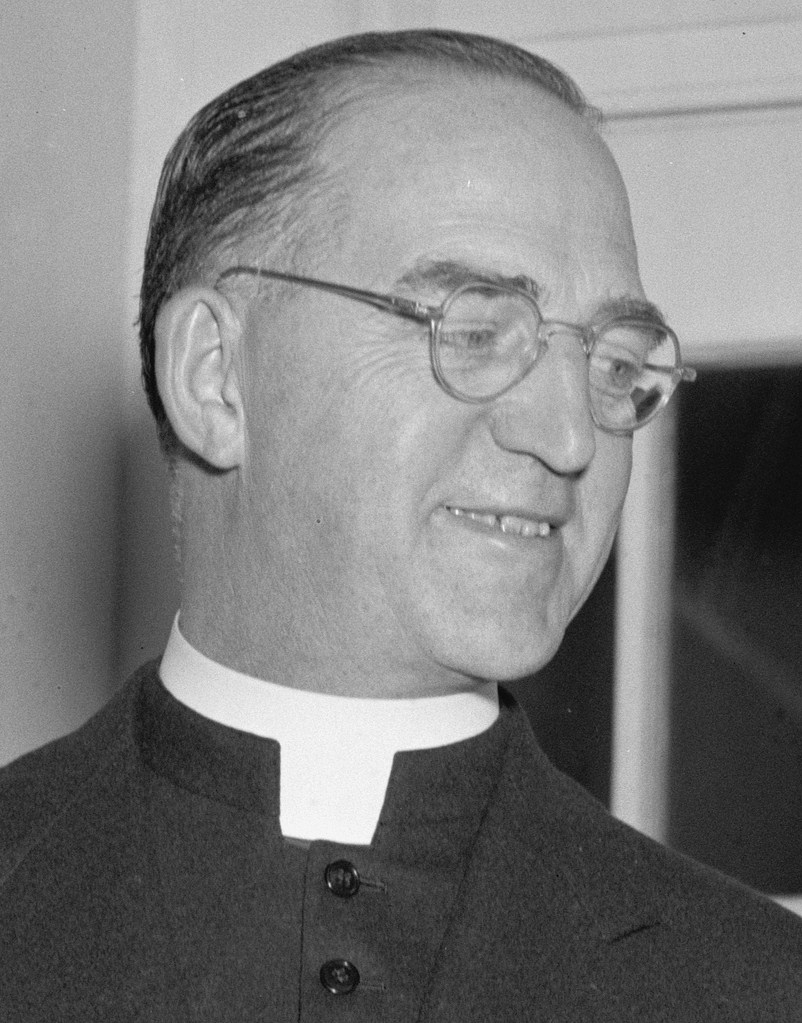
- Flanagan in 1938
- Archdiocese: Omaha

Orders
- Ordination: 26 July 1912
- Rank: Monsignor

Personal details
- Born: Edward Joseph Flanagan; 13 July 1886 Leabeg, County Roscommon, Ireland
- Died: 15 May 1948 (aged 61) Berlin, Germany
- Buried: Dowd Memorial Chapel; Immaculate Conception Parish; Boys Town, Nebraska, US
- Denomination: Catholic
- Occupation: Founder of Boys Town
- Education: Bachelor of Arts (1906); Master of Arts (1908)
- Alma mater: Mount St. Mary's University; Emmitsburg, Maryland, US

Ordination history of Edward J. Flanagan
History
Diaconal ordination
- Date: 25 July 1912
- Place: University of Innsbruck, Innsbruck, Austria-Hungary
Priestly ordination
- Date: 26 July 1912
- Place: University of Innsbruck, Innsbruck, Austria-Hungary

Edward Joseph Flanagan (13 July 1886 – 15 May 1948) was an Irish-born priest of the Catholic Church in the United States who served for decades in Nebraska. After serving as a parish priest in the Diocese of Omaha, he founded the orphanage and educational complex known as Boys Town, located west of the city in what is now Boys Town, Douglas County, Nebraska. In the 21st century, the complex also serves as a center for troubled youth.

Flanagan's work became widely known, especially after he was played by Spencer Tracy in the movie Boys Town (1938). In the post-World War II era, Flanagan was invited by General Douglas MacArthur to visit Japan and Korea, and later Austria and Germany, to advise him on improving conditions for children in the occupied countries.

In 2012, the Archdiocese of Omaha initiated the process for beatification of Flanagan, and he was declared a Servant of God. Documentation for the cause was sent to the Vatican, and in 2026, Flanagan was declared venerable by Pope Leo XIV.

== Early years ==
Flanagan was born in the townland of Leabeg, County Roscommon, near the village of Ballymoe, County Galway, Ireland. His parents were John, a herdsman by trade, and Honora Flanagan. He attended Summerhill College, Sligo, Ireland.

In 1904, he emigrated to the United States with his sister Nellie. He attended Mount St. Mary's University in Emmitsburg, Maryland, where in 1906 he received a Bachelor of Arts degree. Flanagan entered St. Joseph's Seminary in Dunwoodie, New York. Having contracted double pneumonia, Flanagan was forced to take a year off to recover, and stayed with his brother, Father Patrick Flanagan, in Omaha, Nebraska, where Nellie was both housekeeper and nurse.

He then continued his studies in Rome, living at the Capranica while taking classes at Gregorian University. He returned home to Omaha due to his health in the winter of 1908 and took an accounting job at Cudahy Packing Company. Flanagan returned to Europe the following autumn, entering the Royal Imperial Leopold Francis University in Innsbruck, Austria, where he was ordained a priest in 1912.

He returned to the US, where his first assignment was as assistant pastor at St. Patrick's Catholic Church in O'Neill, Nebraska. He was then transferred to St. Patrick's Church in Omaha and was present during the Tornado outbreak sequence of March 1913, responding to the dead and injured. In 1916, Flanagan established a homeless shelter for transient workers. He became a US citizen in 1919.

== Middle years and Boys Town ==
In 1917, moved by the plight of youth, he founded a home for homeless boys in Omaha. Archbishop Jeremiah James Harty of the Diocese of Omaha had misgivings, but endorsed Flanagan's experiment in housing and education. Because the downtown facilities were inadequate, Flanagan established Boys Town, ten miles west of Omaha, in 1921. Under Flanagan's direction, Boys Town grew to be a large community with its own boy-mayor, schools, chapel, post office, cottages, gymnasium, and other facilities. Boys between the ages of 10 and 16 could receive an education here and learn a trade. Flanagan did not believe in the reform school model, which he thought too punitive, and stated, "there's no such thing as a bad boy".

Flanagan's work became widely known, especially after the 1938 release of an MGM film about his life, Boys Town, starring Spencer Tracy as Flanagan and Mickey Rooney as one of the boys. Flanagan was allowed to review the script before filming, some of which took place at the complex. Tracy won an Academy Award for Best Actor for his performance; he talked about Flanagan at his acceptance speech, saying, "If you have seen him through me, then I thank you." An Oscar statuette, dedicated to Flanagan by Tracy, was also given to Boys Town.

== Later years ==
Flanagan served on several committees and boards dealing with the welfare of children. He also published articles on child welfare. Internationally known by the 1940s, in 1946, Flanagan traveled to the Republic of Ireland, where he was appalled by conditions in the children's institutions. He described them as "a national disgrace". When his observations were published after returning to Omaha, Irish print media attacked him, as did the Oireachtas.

General MacArthur, who was leading the Allied occupation of Japan, invited Monsignor Flanagan to Japan and Korea in 1947 to advise on child welfare. He also invited him to review conditions the next year in occupied territory in Austria and Germany, where Flanagan traveled in 1948.

While in Germany, Flanagan died on 15 May 1948 of a heart attack. His body was returned to the United States. He is interred at Dowd Memorial Chapel of the Immaculate Conception Parish in Boys Town, Nebraska.

== Beatification process ==
On 25 February 2012, the Archdiocese of Omaha opened the beatification process for Flanagan. On 17 March 2012, he was given the title of a Servant of God.

On March 23, 2026, Flanagan was recognized for "heroic virtues" by Pope Leo XIV, granting him the title of Venerable.

== Legacy and awards ==
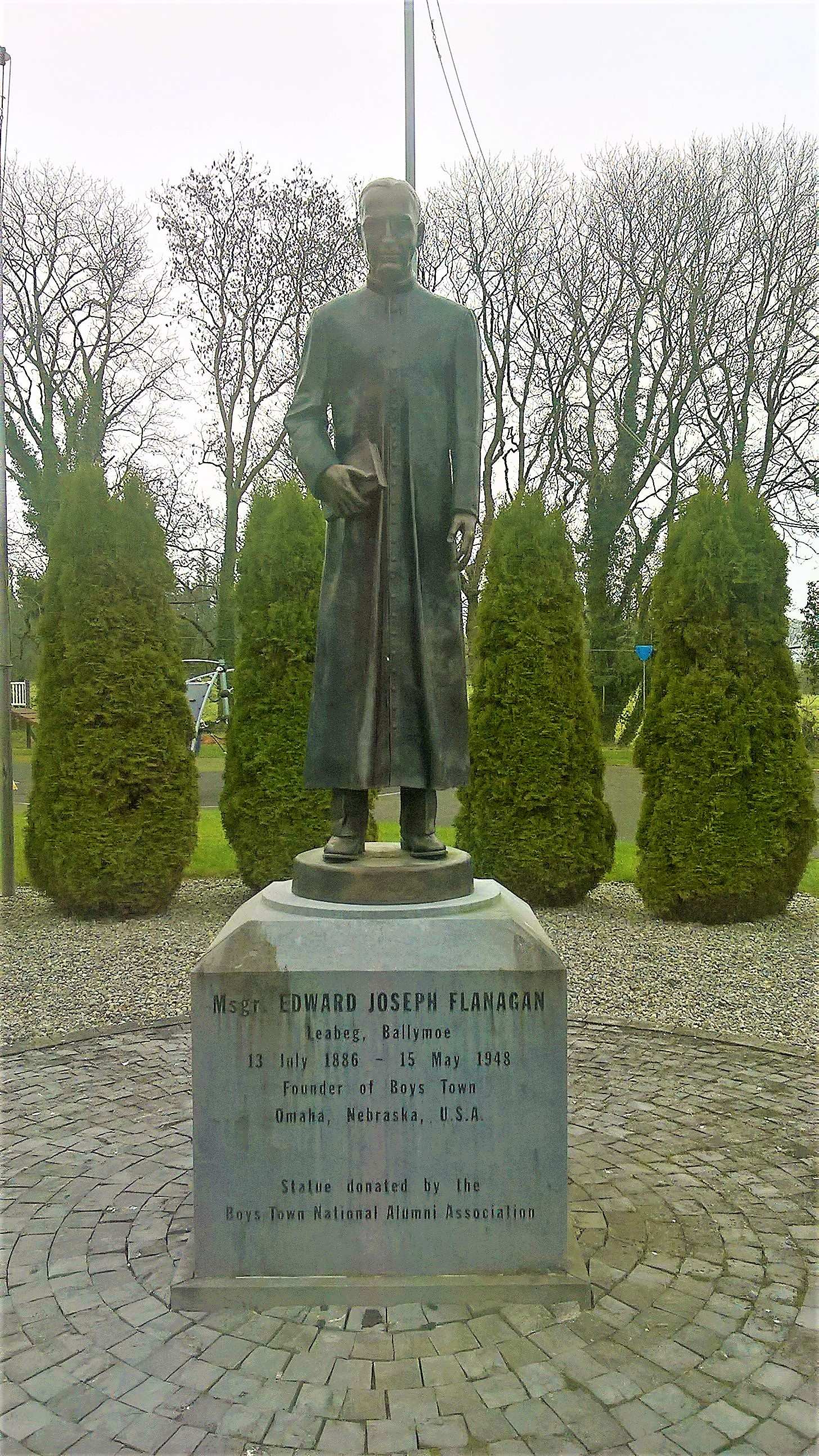
Fr. Edward J. Flanagan statue, Ballymoe, Co Galway

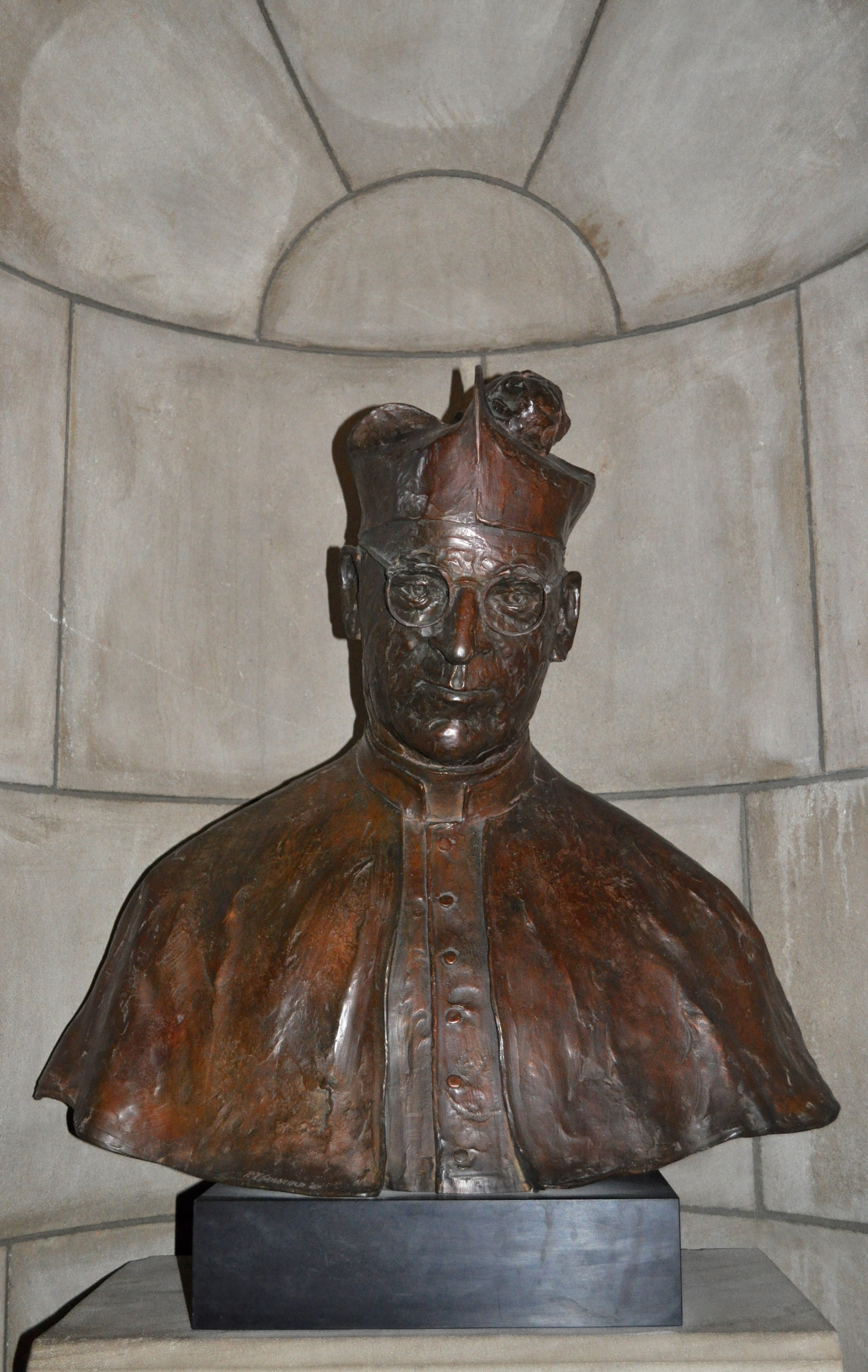
Bust of Flanagan created in 1967 by Paul Granlund for the Nebraska Hall of Fame.

- Flanagan received many awards for his work with delinquent and homeless boys. Pope Pius XI named him in 1937 as a Domestic Prelate, with the title Monsignor.
- Flanagan was inducted into the Nebraska Hall of Fame in 1965.
- A bust of Flanagan was created in 1967 by Paul Granlund for the Nebraska Hall of Fame.
- In 1986, the United States Postal Service issued a 4¢ Great Americans series postage stamp honoring him.
- There is a portrait statue dedicated to Msgr. Edward J. Flanagan in Ballymoe in County Galway.

== Representation in other media ==
- Spencer Tracy starred in Boys Town (1938), loosely inspired by the life and work of Fr. Flanagan, and Mickey Rooney starred as one of the boys. After Tracy won an Oscar for his performance, MGM arranged for another statuette to be inscribed and gave it to Flanagan at Boys Town. It read: "To Father Flanagan, whose great humanity, kindly simplicity, and inspiring courage were strong enough to shine through my humble effort. Spencer Tracy."
- The sequel, Men of Boys Town (1941), also starred Tracy.
- Heart of a Servant - The Father Flanagan Story (2024) is a documentary on Flanagan and Boys Town narrated and co-produced by The Chosen actor, Jonathan Roumie.
