= DeBolt (disambiguation) =

DeBolt is a hamlet in Alberta, Canada. DeBolt, Debolt or De Bolt may also refer to:

- Debolt, Nebraska, a community in the United States
- DeBolt Aerodrome, Alberta, Canada
- Debolt Formation, a stratigraphical unit in the Western Canadian Sedimentary Basin
- Fraser & DeBolt, a Canadian folk duo
- Rezin A. De Bolt, a U.S. Representative from Missouri
- Who Are the DeBolts? And Where Did They Get Nineteen Kids?, a 1977 documentary film about Dorothy and Bob DeBolt
