= Standing Bear Lake =

Park in West Omaha, Nebraska

Coordinates: 41°18′53″N 96°07′34″W

- Interactive map of Standing Bear Lake
- Type: Regional
- Location: South of Bennington, NE
- Area: 685 acres (277 ha)
- Created: 1977
- Operator: City of Omaha
- Status: Open all year

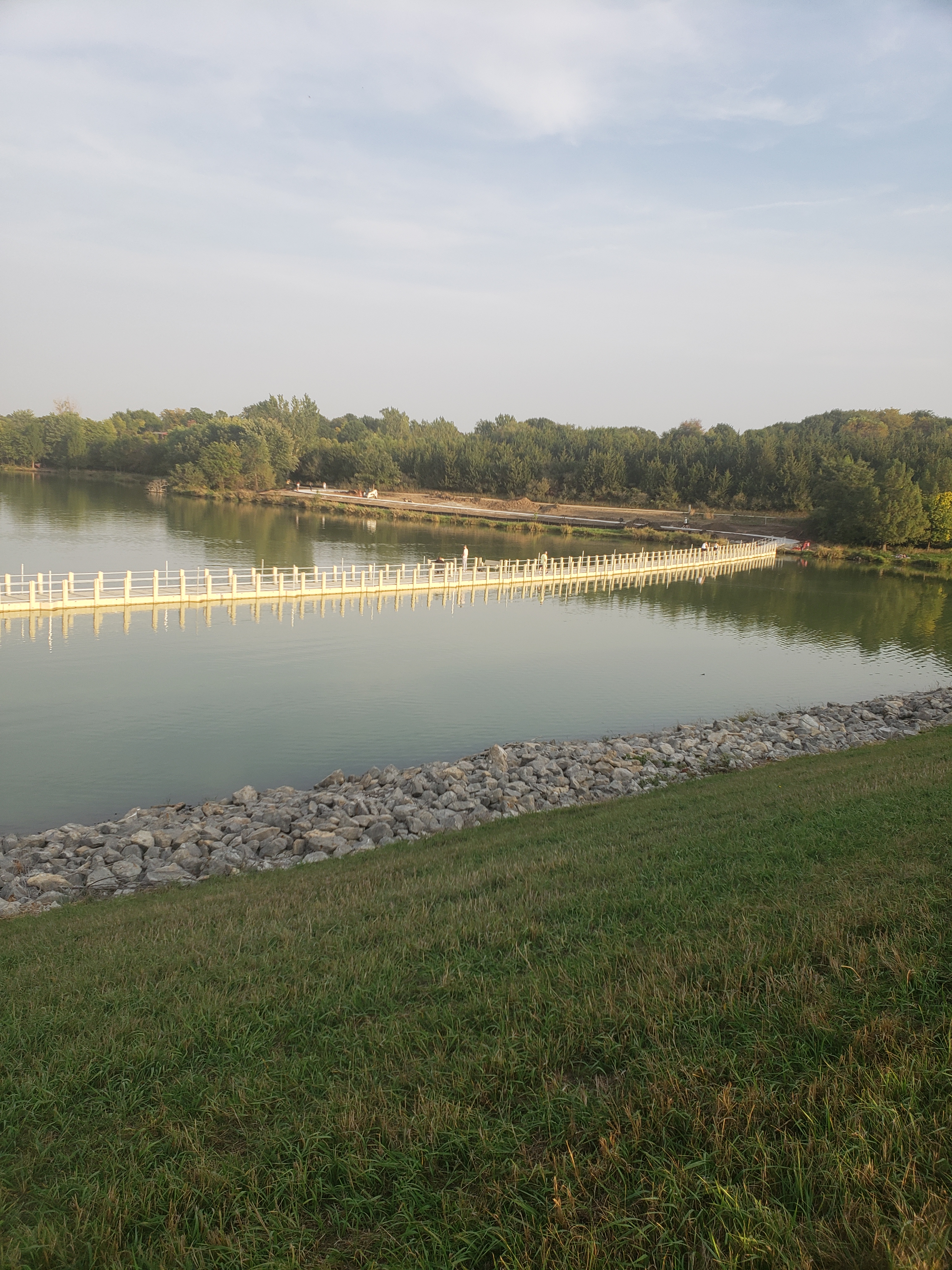
Floating Boardwalk (view of south ramp)

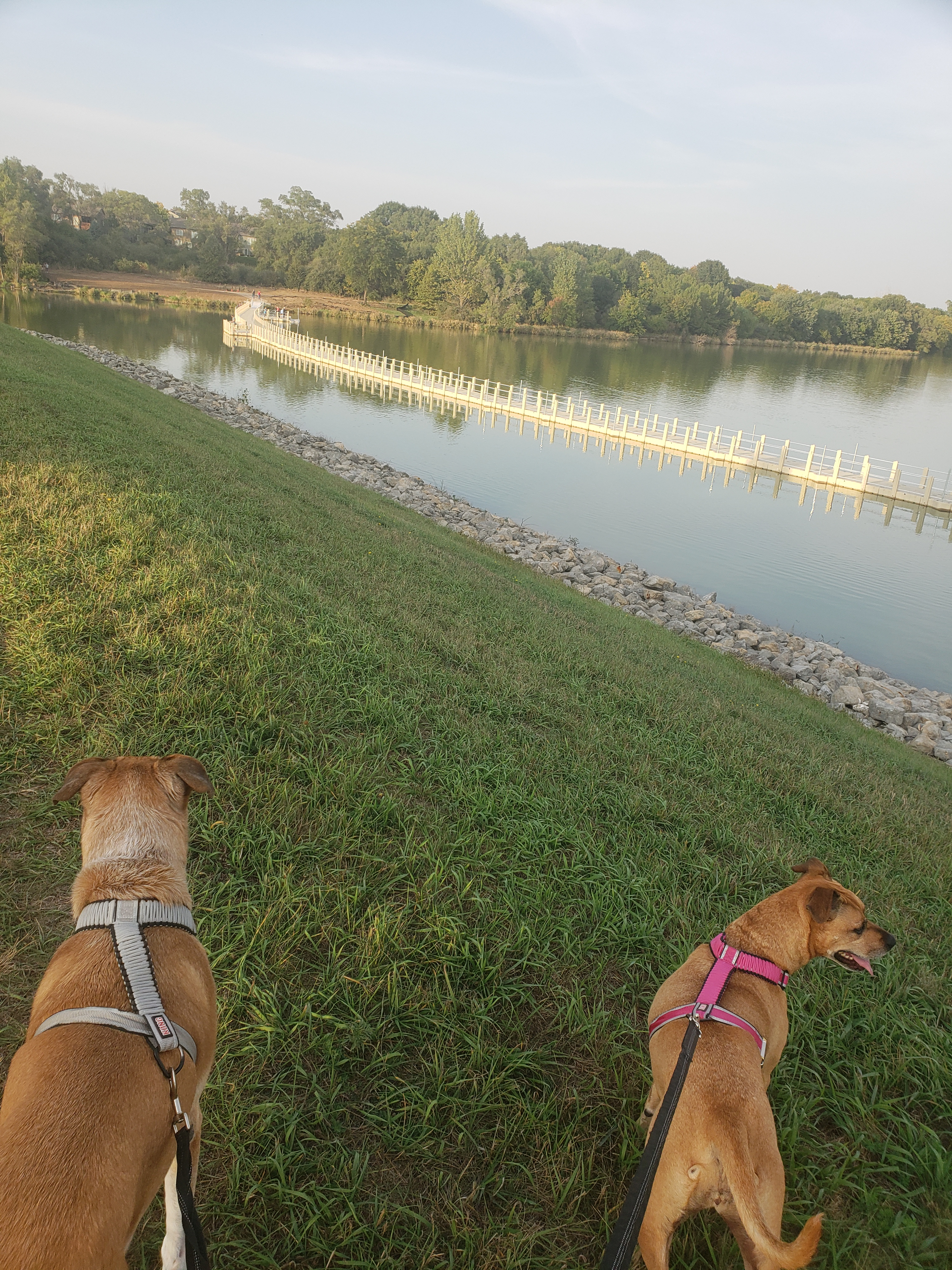
Two dogs check out the boardwalk

Standing Bear Lake, also known as Dam Site 16, is a park located at 6404 North 132nd street in West Omaha, Nebraska.

The park has a 135-acre (55 ha) lake with boating in the summertime, and ice skating in the winter. The park and recreation area covers about 396 acres (160 ha) of land surrounding the lake, with a 131-acre (53 ha) wildlife area is located on the west side of the park.

== History ==
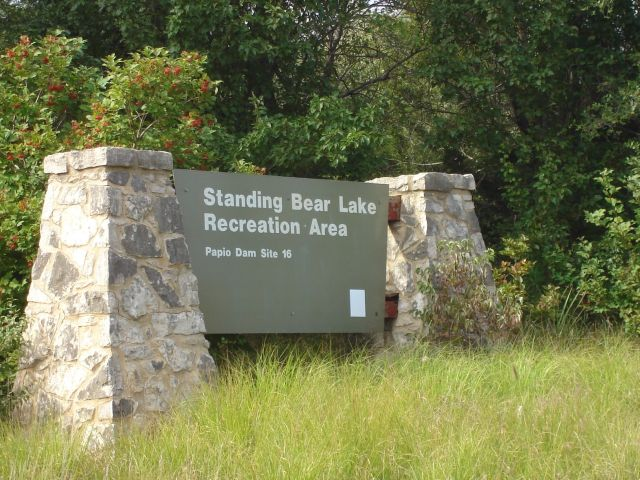

Standing Bear Lake park opened in 1977, and includes fishing and boating, trails, and picnic areas.

Also known as Dam Site 16, the lake was originally built as a dam for flood control on Papillion Creek in the Lower Papio Valley. Recently the Nebraska State Game and Parks Commission added trout fishing to the lake.

The park is named after Chief Standing Bear, who with his people, was told to leave his homeland along the Niobrara River in northeast Nebraska for Indian Territory in Oklahoma. After finding no supplies in Oklahoma and many of his people dying, including his own son, Standing Bear led 30 members of the Ponca Tribe back to Nebraska. He had to fight for the right to be recognized as a human being and his basic humanity, saying, "I am a man. The same God made us both."

== Features ==
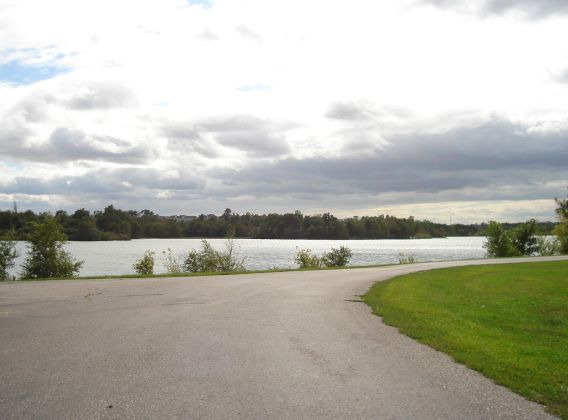

The main entrance to Standing Bear Lake is located on Fort Street at 138th St. This is also known as Entrance 1. Entrance 2 is unmarked as a trail entrance, with no parking lot, on the southwest edge of the lake. Entrance 3 is on the northwest edge of the lake. Entrance 4 is on the northeast edge of the lake. Entrance 5 is on the east edge of the lake. All entrances besides entrance 2 have parking lots.

One of the earliest trails in the Omaha area is around Standing Bear Lake. The 6-foot-wide (1.8 m) trail slopes in places and is connected by a floating boardwalk that was constructed in 2020.

A large variety of fish may be found in the lake, including walleye, catfish, bass, bluegill, crappie, drum, saugeye, yellow bass, and trout.

The park includes a remote control airplane flying field.

Ice skating is offered in the winter.

One unusual feature at Standing Bear is a wind organ. Created by artist Douglas Hollis, the sculpture is a combination of metal pipes placed vertically in the ground. Each pipe has a hole in its side for filtering the wind and making sound.

Standing Bear sits in the middle of various housing developments. This makes it easy to get to, yet it still offers a secluded area to relax and get away from the city.

== See also ==
- Parks in Omaha, Nebraska
