= Omaha Sun =

- Type: Weekly newspaper
- Founded: December 27, 1951
- Ceased publication: August 31, 1983
- Language: English
- Headquarters: Omaha, Nebraska

The Omaha Sun was a weekly newspaper that published from December 27, 1951, to August 31, 1983. It was formerly owned by Berkshire Hathaway, a company headed by investor Warren Buffett.

The staff of The Sun Newspapers of Omaha, Nebraska, was awarded a Pulitzer Prize for Local Investigative Specialized Reporting in 1973 for uncovering the large financial resources of Boys Town, a Catholic youth care center and charity, leading to reforms in the organization's solicitation and use of funds contributed by the public.

Buffett's Berkshire Hathaway bought the newspapers in 1968. The company sold them in 1980 to Hyde Park Herald publisher Bruce Sagan. The Sun newspapers stopped publishing in 1983.
