= West Omaha, Nebraska =

Neighbourhood of Omaha, Nebraska

Coordinates: 41°15′47″N 96°05′28″W

West Omaha is a geographic area of Omaha, Nebraska, that comprises all points within the Omaha metropolitan area west of 90th Street.

== Communities ==
West Omaha is home to several communities, including the historical Boys Town. Ralston, a city in south-central Douglas County surrounded by Omaha on three sides and roughly bounded by 72nd to the east, 84th to the west, L on the north, and Harrison on the south. Elkhorn, on the outskirts of western Omaha and annexed in 2007; Millard, a broad area of southwest Omaha and annexed in 1971. Chalco, an unincorporated area southwest of Omaha in northern Sarpy County, is also widely regarded as a part of west Omaha.

Communities in West Omaha alphabetical order
| Name | Incorporated | Location | Notes |
|---|---|---|---|
| Bennington | 1880s | | |
| Boys Town | 1917 | North 144th to 132nd Streets, West Dodge Road to Pacific Street. | |
| Chalco | 1888 | 156th Street to I-80, Harrison Street to the intersection of 144th Street and I-80. | CDP, in Sarpy County. |
| Elk City | 1884 | Just south of the intersection of North 225th Street and Pawnee Road. | |
| Elkhorn | 1865 | 240th to 180th Streets, Rainwood Road to Harrison Street. | Used to be a separate city; was annexed. |
| Keystone | 1907 | North 90th to 72nd Streets and Military Avenue, Fort Street to Maple Street. | |
| Millard | 1885 | 204th to 108th Streets, Blondo to Harrison Streets. | Used to be a separate city; was annexed. |
| Ralston | 1907 | 84th to 72nd Streets, L to Harrison Streets. | Separate city. |

== Borders ==
West Omaha is bordered by 90th Street on the east, Harrison Street on the south, the Platte River on the west, and Rainwood Road to the north.

== Shopping Centers in West Omaha ==
Shopping centers in West Omaha
| Name | Location | Notes |
|---|---|---|
| Bel-Air Plaza | 120th and West Center Road | Small outdoor shopping center |
| Country Side Village | 87th and Pacific Streets | Small outdoor shopping center |
| Crossroads Mall | 72nd and Dodge Streets | Redevelopment in progress |
| Montclair Shopping Center | 132nd and West Center Road | Small outdoor shopping center |
| Oakview Mall | 144th and Center Streets | A classic indoor shopping mall |
| One Pacific Place | 103rd and Pacific Streets | Small outdoor shopping center |
| Pepperwood Village | 156th and West Dodge Road | Small outdoor shopping center |
| Regency Shopping Mall | 103rd and West Dodge Road | A unique indoor shopping mall that hosts Borsheims, a jewelry store |
| Rockbrook Village | 108th and Pacific Streets | An outdoor shopping center |
| Shops of Legacy | 168th and West Center Road | An outdoor shopping center |
| Village Pointe | 168th and West Dodge Road | An outdoor shopping center |
| Westroads Mall | 102nd and California Streets | The largest mall in Omaha |

== See also ==
- Neighborhoods of Omaha, Nebraska
