= Omaha Bus Station =

Intercity bus station in Omaha, Nebraska

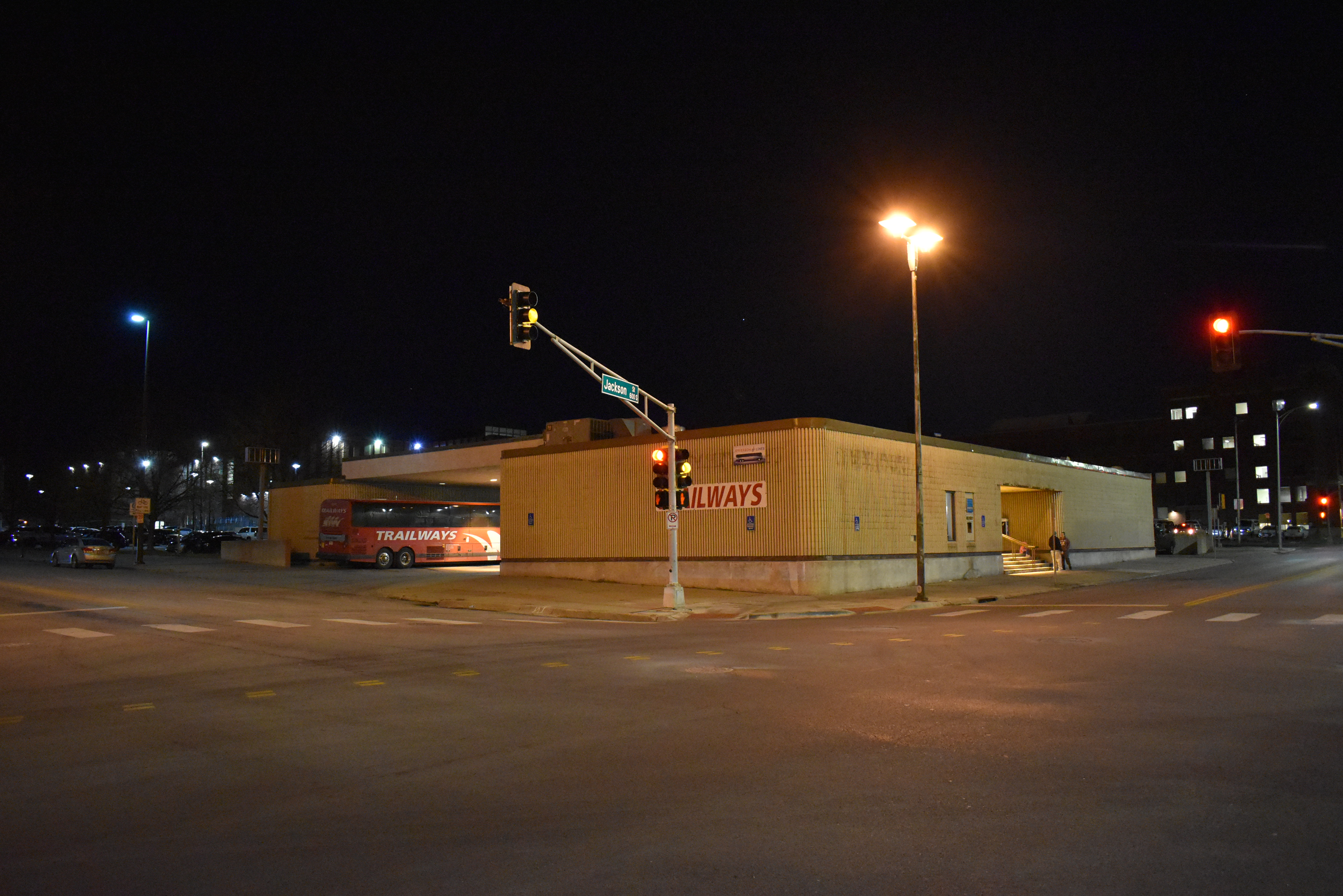
- The current bus station in November 2023

General information
- Location: 1601 Jackson St, Omaha, Nebraska
- Coordinates: 41.254251°N 95.937522°W
- Owner: Douglas County
- Operator: Burlington Trailways
- Bus operators: Burlington Trailways; Express Arrow; Jefferson Lines
- Connections: Metro Transit 11, 36

Other information
- Website: Official website

History
- Opened: 1948
Location

The Omaha Bus Station is an intercity bus station in downtown Omaha, Nebraska. The station, managed by Burlington Trailways, also serves Express Arrow and Jefferson Lines. The current building was constructed in 1948.

Omaha has seen intercity bus transit since about 1917, with early 16 seat buses traveling to Fremont and Blair. In 1929, a Union Bus Depot was constructed on the southwest corner of 16th and Jackson. In 1948, both Greyhound Lines and Trailways constructed new bus stations in the city. This setup lasted until Greyhound took over Trailways in 1987, and consequently moved into the former Trailways station. Today, the former Trailways station is the only intercity bus station in the city.

== Attributes ==
The current bus station sits at the southwest corner of 16th and Jackson streets with the main entrance located on Jackson Street. The facility is owned by Douglas County, and leased to Burlington Trailways. Other operators using the station include Express Arrow and Jefferson Lines.

== History ==
=== Early stations ===
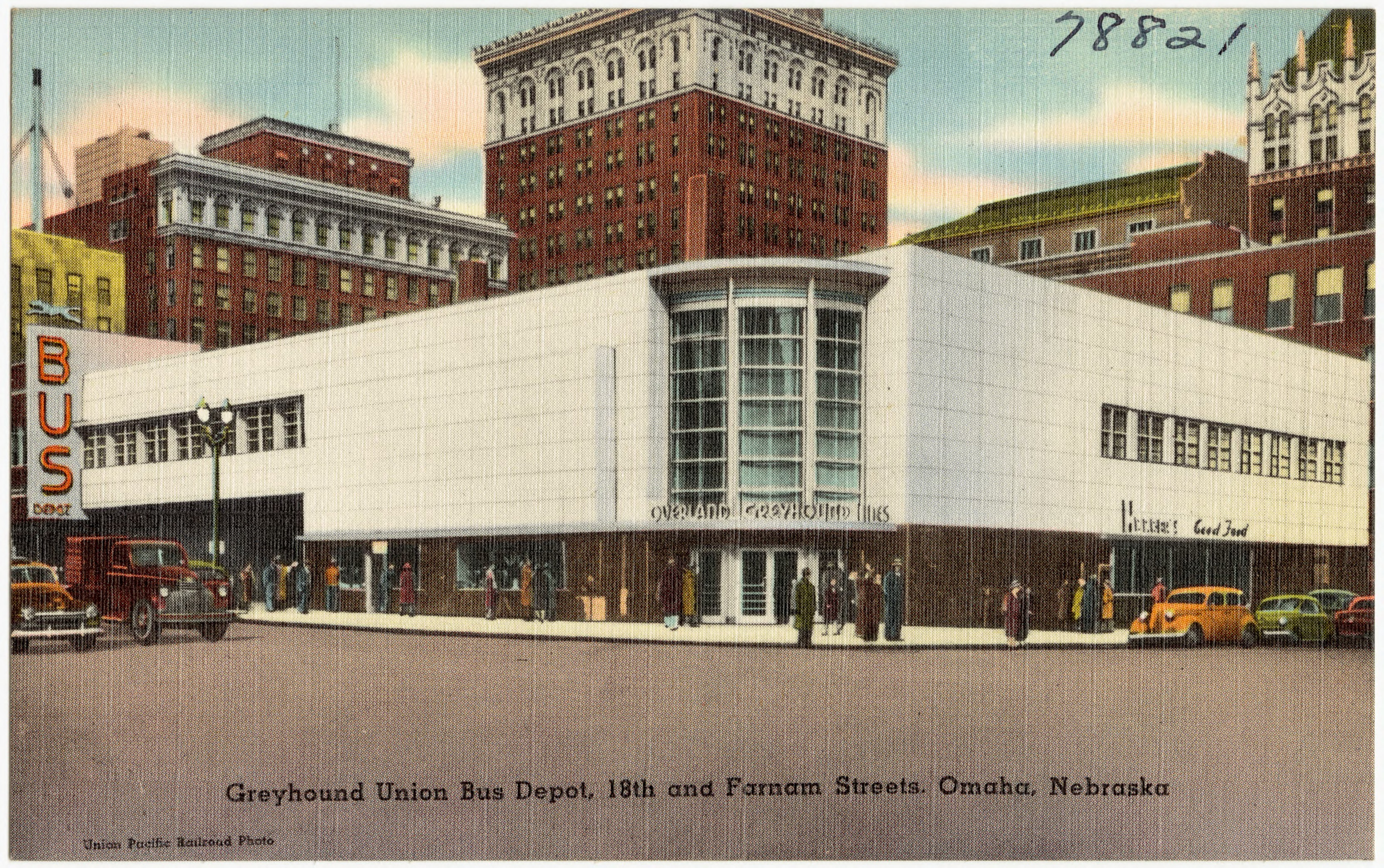
The former Greyhound station at 18th and Farnam

The first dedicated intercity bus station in Omaha was the Union Bus Depot, which opened in 1929 at the southwest corner of 16th and Jackson streets. Within a short time period, the depot saw 35,000 passengers pass through every month. In 1948, both Greyhound Lines and Trailways moved out to build their own facilities.

Greyhound built a terminal at the northwest corner of 18th and Farnam streets, opening for service March 22, 1948. Designed by James T. Allen at a cost of $500,000, it was said to be the most modern bus station in the country. At its opening, it served Overland-Greyhound, Interstate Transit Lines and Union Pacific Stages, Davis Bus Lines, Neal Stages, Thornton Bus Line, and Missouri Pacific Trailways. The new terminal saw 72 arrivals and departures daily, with 800-1000 daily passengers.

=== Current station ===
Meanwhile, Continental Trailways began service to a new station, located on the same site as the old Union Bus Depot. This arrangement of two intercity bus stations lasted until the late 1980s, when Greyhound acquired Trailways in 1987. Initially, Greyhound moved operations to its own facility, but soon returned all service to the former Continental Trailways station. To bring the facility up to modern standards, Greyhound spent $200,000 on expansion and renovation, adding a restaurant to the station.

Greyhound service to Omaha ended August 15, 2012, after more than eight decades of bus service to Omaha. In 2013, Douglas County purchased the bus station from Greyhound, and has since continued to lease the station to Burlington Trailways. Burlington Trailways has maintained a month to month lease on the property, with long-term plans to relocate, potentially to the Omaha Amtrak station.

== See also ==
- Transportation in Omaha
- Omaha station
