= Douglas County, Nebraska =

County in Nebraska, United States

- County
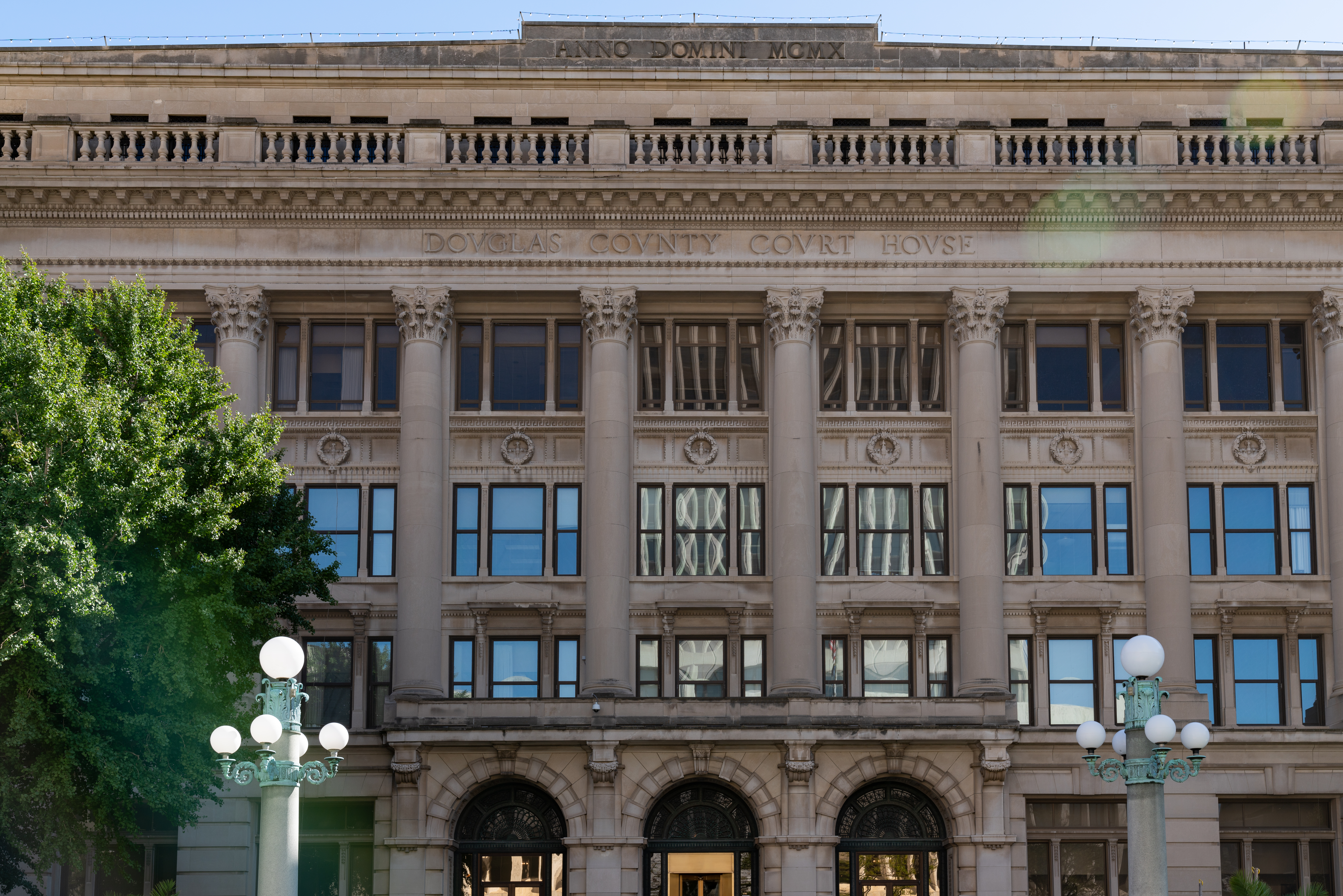
- The Douglas County Courthouse in Omaha

- Seal

- Location within the U.S. state of Nebraska
- Coordinates: 41.2971°N 96.1541°W
- Country: United States
- State: Nebraska
- Founded: November 23, 1854
- Named for: Stephen A. Douglas
- Seat: Omaha
- Largest city: Omaha

Area
  - Total: 349.342 sq mi (904.79 km^{2})
  - Land: 326.540 sq mi (845.73 km^{2})
  - Water: 12.802 sq mi (33.16 km^{2}) 3.66%

Population (2020)
  - Total: 584,526
  - Estimate (2025): 606,460 ▲
  - Density: 1,790.06/sq mi (691.146/km^{2})
- Time zone: UTC−6 (Central)
  - Summer (DST): UTC−5 (CDT)
- Area code: 402 and 531
- Congressional district: 2nd
- Website: douglascounty-ne.gov
- • Nebraska county number 28 • Nebraska license plate prefix 01

Douglas County is a county located in the U.S. state of Nebraska. As of the 2020 census, the population was 584,526, and was estimated to be 606,460 in 2025, making it the most populous county in Nebraska. The county seat and the largest city is Omaha, the most populous city in Nebraska and the 41st-most populous city in the United States. It contains over 30.05% of the state's population.

Douglas County is part of the Omaha–Council Bluffs metropolitan area.

In the Nebraska license plate system, Douglas County was represented by the prefix "1" (as it had the largest number of vehicles registered in the state when the license plate system was established in 1922). In 2002, the state discontinued the 1922 system in the three most populous counties: Douglas, Lancaster, and Sarpy Counties.

== History ==
Long before its formal organization, the region comprising modern-day Douglas County was inhabited by the Native American peoples of the Otoe, Pawnee, and Omaha tribes. Using the Missouri River Valley for hunting, agriculture and trade, these nations lived in the region for hundreds of years before European encroachment. With longstanding French and Spanish incursions before them, Lewis and Clark Expedition passed through the Douglas County area in 1804 and began significant Euro-American interest in the territory.

Douglas County was created on November 23, 1854 and named after Stephen A. Douglas (1813–1861), who was then serving as a U.S. senator from Illinois.

The city of Omaha was founded shortly after and quickly became the county seat of Douglas County. For the next 50 years, it was a primary point for European travelers going along the Mormon Trail, the Oregon Trail, and the Great Platte River Road. When President Abraham Lincoln designated the city as the eastern terminus for the Union Pacific Railroad in the 1860s, Omaha became a national transportation hub. Immigrants and industries grew in the city consequentially, and by the late 1800s the Union Stockyards in South Omaha had opened. Eventually they became one of the largest livestock processing centers in the world, earning the city the nickname "The Gate City."

In the next century, Douglas County transitioned into a diverse urban and suburban center in the Midwestern United States. The economy diversified beyond agriculture and meatpacking into insurance, telecommunications, and finance because of the Trans-Mississippi Exposition and other circumstances. Despite that, racial tensions culminated in the 1919 lynching of Will Brown and subsequent riots. The environmental impact of industrialization afflicted the city, too. However, the establishment of the Offutt Air Force Base in neighboring Sarpy County and the continued presence of the Strategic Air Command further solidified Douglas County's relevance to the national economy. Today, Douglas County is the most populous county in Nebraska and is characterized by a blend of historic preservation and modern development. It remains a vital economic engine for the Great Plains, anchoring a metropolitan area that bridges the traditional agricultural roots of the Midwest with the demands of a globalized digital era.

== Geography ==
According to the United States Census Bureau, the county has a total area of 349.342 square miles (904.79 km^{2}), of which 326.540 square miles (845.73 km^{2}) is land and 12.802 square miles (33.16 km^{2}) (3.66%) is water. It is the third-smallest county in Nebraska by total area. Douglas County is on the eastern border of Nebraska. Its east boundary line abuts the west boundary line of the state of Iowa, across the Missouri River. The Elkhorn River runs southward through the west-central part of Douglas County, and it is bordered on east (Missouri River) and west (Platte River) by rivers.

=== Major highways ===
- Interstate 80
- Interstate 480
- Interstate 680
- U.S. Highway 6
- U.S. Highway 75
- U.S. Highway 275
- Nebraska Highway 31
- Nebraska Highway 36
- Nebraska Highway 50
- Nebraska Highway 64
- Nebraska Highway 85
- Nebraska Highway 92
- Nebraska Highway 133

=== Transit ===
- Amtrak California Zephyr (Omaha station)
- Burlington Trailways (Omaha Bus Station)
- Express Arrow (Omaha Bus Station)
- Jefferson Lines (Omaha Bus Station)
- Metro Transit

=== Adjacent counties ===
- Dodge County – northwest
- Washington County – north
- Pottawattamie County, Iowa – east
- Sarpy County – south
- Saunders County – west

=== Protected areas ===
- Bluestem Prairie Preserve
- Two Rivers State Recreation Area

== Demographics ==
Historical population
Census	Pop.	Note	%±
1860	4,328		—
1870	19,982		361.7%
1880	37,645		88.4%
1890	158,008		319.7%
1900	140,590		−11.0%
1910	168,546		19.9%
1920	204,524		21.3%
1930	232,982		13.9%
1940	247,562		6.3%
1950	281,020		13.5%
1960	343,490		22.2%
1970	389,455		13.4%
1980	397,038		1.9%
1990	416,444		4.9%
2000	463,585		11.3%
2010	517,110		11.5%
2020	584,526		13.0%
2025 (est.)	606,460	▲	3.8%
U.S. Decennial Census; 1790–1960 1900–1990; 1990–2000 2010–2020

As of the third quarter of 2025, the median home value in Douglas County was $295,502.

As of the 2024 American Community Survey, there are 243,978 estimated households in Douglas County with an average of 2.42 persons per household. The county has a median household income of $80,382. Approximately 12.1% of the county's population lives at or below the poverty line. Douglas County has an estimated 67.0% employment rate, with 42.3% of the population holding a bachelor's degree or higher and 91.6% holding a high school diploma. There were 257,743 housing units at an average density of 789.32 per square mile (304.8/km^{2}).

The top five reported languages (people were allowed to report up to two languages, thus the figures will generally add to more than 100%) were English (82.0%), Spanish (10.8%), Indo-European (3.1%), Asian and Pacific Islander (2.2%), and Other (1.8%).

The median age in the county was 35.7 years.

Douglas County, Nebraska – racial and ethnic composition Note: the US Census treats Hispanic/Latino as an ethnic category. This table excludes Latinos from the racial categories and assigns them to a separate category. Hispanics/Latinos may be of any race.
Race / ethnicity (NH = non-Hispanic)	Pop. 1980	Pop. 1990	Pop. 2000	Pop. 2010	Pop. 2020
White alone (NH)	344,269 (86.71%)	353,374 (84.86%)	362,528 (78.20%)	372,029 (71.94%)	381,427 (65.25%)
Black or African American alone (NH)	39,526 (9.96%)	45,104 (10.83%)	52,821 (11.39%)	59,176 (11.44%)	63,706 (10.90%)
Native American or Alaska Native alone (NH)	1,945 (0.49%)	2,279 (0.55%)	2,411 (0.52%)	2,532 (0.49%)	2,653 (0.45%)
Asian alone (NH)	2,211 (0.56%)	3,945 (0.95%)	7,848 (1.69%)	13,613 (2.63%)	27,593 (4.72%)
Pacific Islander alone (NH)	—	—	213 (0.05%)	314 (0.06%)	410 (0.07%)
Other race alone (NH)	851 (0.21%)	374 (0.09%)	512 (0.11%)	930 (0.18%)	2,310 (0.40%)
Mixed race or multiracial (NH)	—	—	6,324 (1.36%)	10,712 (2.07%)	25,607 (4.38%)
Hispanic or Latino (any race)	8,236 (2.07%)	11,368 (2.73%)	30,928 (6.67%)	57,804 (11.18%)	80,820 (13.83%)
Total	397,038 (100.00%)	416,444 (100.00%)	463,585 (100.00%)	517,110 (100.00%)	584,526 (100.00%)

=== 2024 estimate ===
As of the 2024 estimate, there were 601,158 people, 243,978 households, and _ families residing in the county. The population density was 1,840.99 inhabitants per square mile (710.8/km^{2}). There were 257,743 housing units at an average density of 789.32 per square mile (304.8/km^{2}). The racial makeup of the county was 78.3% White (65.4% NH White), 11.9% African American, 1.5% Native American, 5.0% Asian, 0.1% Pacific Islander, _% from some other races and 3.2% from two or more races. Hispanic or Latino people of any race were 15.3% of the population.

=== 2020 census ===
As of the 2020 census, there were 584,526 people, 229,416 households, and 140,829 families residing in the county. The population density was 1,790.06 inhabitants per square mile (691.1/km^{2}). There were 245,050 housing units at an average density of 750.44 per square mile (289.7/km^{2}). The racial makeup of the county was 68.16% White, 11.07% African American, 0.99% Native American, 4.76% Asian, 0.09% Pacific Islander, 6.34% from some other races and 8.60% from two or more races. Hispanic or Latino people of any race were 13.83% of the population.

The median age was 34.9 years. 25.4% of residents were under the age of 18 and 13.6% of residents were 65 years of age or older. For every 100 females there were 97.2 males, and for every 100 females age 18 and over there were 94.7 males age 18 and over.

97.6% of residents lived in urban areas, while 2.4% lived in rural areas.

There were 229,416 households in the county, of which 31.8% had children under the age of 18 living with them and 28.6% had a female householder with no spouse or partner present. About 30.8% of all households were made up of individuals and 10.3% had someone living alone who was 65 years of age or older.

There were 245,050 housing units, of which 6.4% were vacant. Among occupied housing units, 59.8% were owner-occupied and 40.2% were renter-occupied. The homeowner vacancy rate was 1.0% and the rental vacancy rate was 8.2%.

=== 2010 census ===
As of the 2010 census, there were 517,110 people, 202,411 households, and 127,399 families residing in the county. The population density was 1,583.60 inhabitants per square mile (611.4/km^{2}). There were 219,580 housing units at an average density of 672.44 per square mile (259.6/km^{2}). The racial makeup of the county was 76.39% White, 11.62% African American, 0.72% Native American, 2.66% Asian, 0.08% Pacific Islander, 5.73% from some other races and 2.80% from two or more races. Hispanic or Latino people of any race were 11.18% of the population. 30.0% were of German, 15.0% Irish, 8.0% English, and 4.9% Italian ancestry.

The median income for a household in the county was $51,878, and the median income for a family was $67,666. Males had a median income of $44,542 versus $35,801 for females. The per capita income for the county was $28,092. About 9.4% of families and 13.1% of the population were below the poverty line, including 17.6% of those under age 18 and 8.0% of those age 65 or over.

=== 2000 census ===
As of the 2000 census, there were 463,585 people, 182,194 households, and 115,146 families residing in the county. The population density was 1,419.69 inhabitants per square mile (548.1/km^{2}). There were 192,672 housing units at an average density of 590.04 per square mile (227.8/km^{2}). The racial makeup of the county was 80.96% White, 11.50% African American, 0.61% Native American, 1.71% Asian, 0.05% Pacific Islander, 3.40% from some other races and 1.76% from two or more races. Hispanic or Latino people of any race were 6.67% of the population. 26.3% were of German, 11.5% Irish and 6.2% English ancestry.

There were 182,194 households, out of which 32.00% had children under the age of 18 living with them, 47.50% were married couples living together, 12.10% had a female householder with no husband present, and 36.80% were non-families. 29.80% of all households were made up of individuals, and 8.70% had someone living alone who was 65 years of age or older. The average household size was 2.48 and the average family size was 3.12.

The county population contained 26.60% under the age of 18, 10.30% from 18 to 24, 31.20% from 25 to 44, 21.00% from 45 to 64, and 11.00% who were 65 years of age or older. The median age was 34 years. For every 100 females there were 95.70 males. For every 100 females age 18 and over, there were 92.90 males.

The median income for a household in the county was $43,209, and the median income for a family was $54,651. Males had a median income of $36,577 versus $27,265 for females. The per capita income for the county was $22,879. About 6.70% of families and 9.80% of the population were below the poverty line, including 13.00% of those under age 18 and 7.20% of those age 65 or over.

== Government ==
Douglas County is governed by a board of seven county commissioners, elected to staggered four–year terms. County courthouse positions are also elected on a partisan basis. Most of the county's offices are located at the Douglas County Courthouse.

Douglas County Commission

District	Commissioner
1	Roger Garcia
2	James Cavanaugh
3	Chris Rodgers (Vice-chair)
4	P. J. Morgan
5	Brian Fahey
6	Mary Ann Borgeson (Chair)
7	Mike Friend

Douglas County Officeholders

Office	Officeholder
Assessor/Register of Deeds	Walt Peffer
County Attorney	Donald Kleine
County Clerk/Comptroller	Dan Esch
Clerk of the District Court	Crystal Rhoades
County Engineer	Todd Pfitzer
County Sheriff	Aaron Hanson
County Treasurer	Tim Cavanaugh
Public Defender	Tom Riley

For much of the time after World War II, Douglas County was one of the more conservative urban counties in the United States. It supported the Republican candidate for president in all but one election from 1952 to 2004. However, it has become a far more competitive county in national elections compared to the rest of the state in the last ten years. Barack Obama won a majority of the county's votes in 2008, becoming the first Democrat to do so since 1964. He also narrowly carried the 2nd congressional district as well, garnering him one electoral vote statewide. It swung back to the Republican column in 2012 with Mitt Romney winning the county by an even closer majority. The county swung back to Democratic hands in 2016 with Hillary Clinton winning a plurality of its votes, but unlike Obama eight years prior she failed to carry the 2nd congressional district. In 2020, Joe Biden won the county by 11 points, a 56-year high for Democrats, and flipped the 2nd district back into the Democratic column.

As of January 2025, Douglas County is one of the only two counties in Nebraska (alongside Thurston) to have a plurality of registered Democrats.

Political Party	Number of registered voters (April 1, 2026)	Percent
Democratic	132,302	36.07%
Republican	129,400	35.28%
Independent	95,290	25.98%
Libertarian	5,545	1.51%
Legal Marijuana Now	4,246	1.16%
Total	366,783	100.00%

United States presidential election results for Douglas County, Nebraska
Year	Republican		Democratic		Third party(ies)	
Year	No.	%	No.	%	No.	%
1880	3,290	55.87%	2,407	40.87%	192	3.26%
1884	4,894	51.61%	4,516	47.62%	73	0.77%
1888	10,237	47.53%	10,810	50.19%	493	2.29%
1892	10,702	48.27%	2,904	13.10%	8,566	38.63%
1896	12,326	49.95%	11,755	47.64%	596	2.42%
1900	14,266	50.88%	13,241	47.23%	530	1.89%
1904	15,248	57.87%	6,831	25.93%	4,270	16.21%
1908	14,066	45.80%	15,583	50.74%	1,064	3.46%
1912	6,185	21.12%	12,908	44.08%	10,189	34.80%
1916	14,557	35.13%	24,796	59.84%	2,084	5.03%
1920	28,543	57.81%	18,439	37.34%	2,393	4.85%
1924	29,390	44.98%	18,672	28.58%	17,278	26.44%
1928	47,551	52.60%	42,267	46.75%	587	0.65%
1932	33,938	35.81%	59,347	62.62%	1,483	1.56%
1936	35,349	33.01%	70,245	65.60%	1,482	1.38%
1940	53,325	44.38%	66,840	55.62%	0	0.00%
1944	53,443	45.60%	63,762	54.40%	0	0.00%
1948	47,175	48.92%	49,258	51.08%	0	0.00%
1952	71,457	56.24%	55,591	43.76%	0	0.00%
1956	73,270	59.39%	50,110	40.61%	0	0.00%
1960	72,005	52.92%	64,060	47.08%	0	0.00%
1964	61,613	44.30%	77,480	55.70%	0	0.00%
1968	69,808	50.89%	51,617	37.63%	15,739	11.47%
1972	101,579	67.82%	48,201	32.18%	0	0.00%
1976	93,204	58.73%	61,877	38.99%	3,626	2.28%
1980	96,908	59.12%	51,668	31.52%	15,354	9.37%
1984	112,676	65.26%	58,979	34.16%	1,003	0.58%
1988	99,916	56.27%	76,541	43.11%	1,108	0.62%
1992	93,512	46.73%	67,097	33.53%	39,512	19.74%
1996	92,334	51.38%	70,708	39.34%	16,679	9.28%
2000	101,025	55.16%	73,347	40.05%	8,784	4.80%
2004	120,813	58.34%	83,330	40.24%	2,928	1.41%
2008	106,291	46.89%	116,810	51.53%	3,600	1.59%
2012	113,220	50.56%	106,456	47.54%	4,251	1.90%
2016	108,077	44.95%	113,798	47.33%	18,558	7.72%
2020	119,159	43.09%	150,350	54.37%	7,031	2.54%
2024	120,919	43.95%	148,733	54.06%	5,493	2.00%

== Communities ==
=== Cities ===
- Bennington
- Omaha (county seat)
  - East Omaha
  - Elkhorn (Omaha)
  - Millard (Omaha)
  - North Omaha
  - South Omaha
  - West Omaha
- Ralston
- Valley

=== Villages ===
- Boys Town
- Waterloo

=== Census-designated places ===
- King Lake
- Venice

=== Unincorporated communities ===
- Briggs
- Debolt
- Elk City
- Irvington
- Lane

== Education ==
School districts include:

- Arlington Public Schools #24, Arlington
- Bennington Public Schools #59, Bennington
- Douglas County West Community Schools #15, Valley
- Elkhorn Public Schools #10, Elkhorn
- Fort Calhoun Community Schools #3, Fort Calhoun
- Fremont Public Schools #1, Fremont
- Gretna Public Schools #37, Gretna
- Millard Public Schools #17, Omaha
- Omaha Public Schools #1, Omaha
- Ralston Public Schools #54, Ralston
- Westside Community Schools #66, Omaha
- Yutan Public Schools #9, Yutan

A state-operated school, Nebraska School for the Deaf, was formerly in the county.

== See also ==
- Ackerhurst Dairy Barn
- National Register of Historic Places listings in Douglas County, Nebraska
