= Boys Town, Nebraska =

Village in Douglas County, Nebraska, United States

- Village
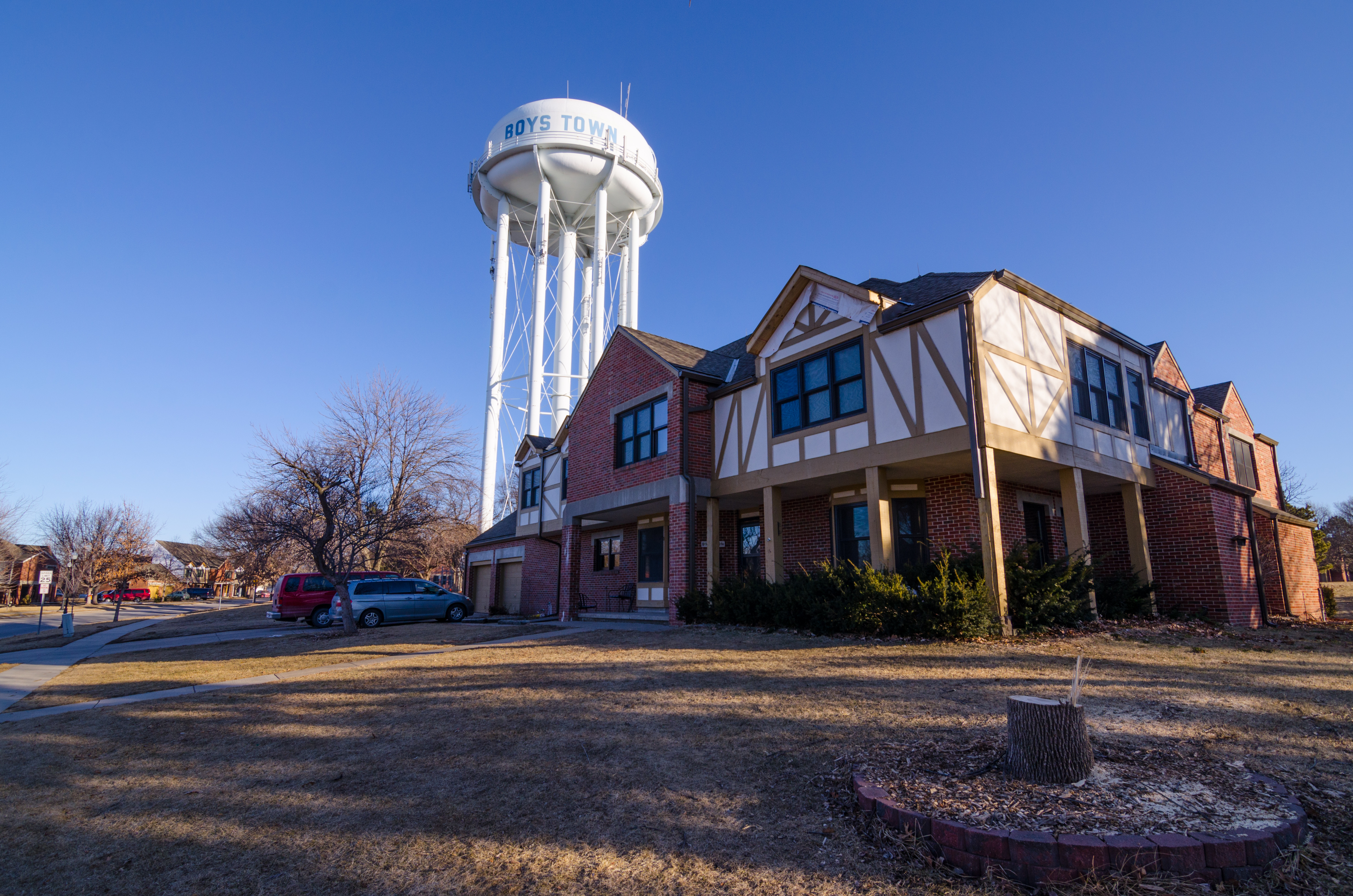
- Boys Town water tower, March 2015
- Interactive map of Boys Town, Nebraska
- Location within Nebraska Location within the United States
- Coordinates: 41.255981°N 96.128438°W
- Country: United States
- State: Nebraska
- County: Douglas
- Founded: December 12, 1917
- Incorporated: 1934

Government
  - Mayor: Evan
  - Vice mayor: Boomie

Area
  - Total: 0.948 sq mi (2.455 km^{2})
  - Land: 0.908 sq mi (2.351 km^{2})
  - Water: 0.040 sq mi (0.103 km^{2}) 4.22%
- Elevation: 1,224 ft (373 m)

Population (2020)
  - Total: 410
  - Estimate (2024): 649
  - Density: 450/sq mi (170/km^{2})
- Time zone: UTC−6 (Central (CST))
  - Summer (DST): UTC−5 (CDT)
- ZIP Code: 68010
- Area codes: 402 and 531
- FIPS code: 31-06015
- GNIS feature ID: 2398159
- Website: boystown.org

Boys Town is a village in Douglas County, Nebraska, United States. The population was 410 at the 2020 census, and was estimated at 649 in 2024. Boys Town is an enclave and a suburb of Omaha.

== History ==
The village of Boys Town was established on December 12, 1917 as the headquarters of Father Flanagan's Boys' Home (Boys Town), founded by Father Edward J. Flanagan. The village houses the national headquarters of Boys Town, homes for the youth served and the families that care for them, a church, a museum (The Hall of History), a school, a post office, a fire station, visitor’s center, cafe and other buildings. The village is a National Historic Landmark and is listed on the National Register of Historic Places.

== Geography ==
According to the United States Census Bureau, the village has a total area of 0.948 square miles (2.46 km^{2}), of which 0.908 square miles (2.35 km^{2}) is land and 0.040 square miles (0.10 km^{2}) (4.22%) is water.

== Demographics ==
Historical population
Census	Pop.	Note	%±
1940	254		—
1950	975		283.9%
1960	997		2.3%
1970	989		−0.8%
1980	622		−37.1%
1990	794		27.7%
2000	818		3.0%
2010	745		−8.9%
2020	410		−45.0%
2024 (est.)	649	▲	58.3%
U.S. Decennial Census; 2020 Census

According to realtor website Zillow, the average price of a home as of January 31, 2026, in Boys Town is $295,169.

As of the 2024 American Community Survey, there are 8 estimated households in Boys Town with an average of 2.63 persons per household. The village has a median household income of $73,750. Approximately 66.3% of the village's population lives at or below the poverty line. Boys Town has an estimated 27.7% employment rate, with 31.4% of the population holding a bachelor's degree or higher and 100.0% holding a high school diploma. There were 29 housing units at an average density of 31.94 per square mile (12.3/km^{2}).

The top five reported languages (people were allowed to report up to two languages, thus the figures will generally add to more than 100%) were English (86.3%), Spanish (13.7%), Indo-European (0.0%), Asian and Pacific Islander (0.0%), and Other (0.0%).

The median age in the village was 18.5 years.

Boys Town, Nebraska – racial and ethnic composition Note: the US Census treats Hispanic/Latino as an ethnic category. This table excludes Latinos from the racial categories and assigns them to a separate category. Hispanics/Latinos may be of any race.
Race / ethnicity (NH = non-Hispanic)	Pop. 2000	Pop. 2010	Pop. 2020	% 2000	% 2010	% 2020
White alone (NH)	524	433	232	64.06%	58.12%	56.59%
Black or African American alone (NH)	167	190	99	20.42%	25.50%	24.15%
Native American or Alaska Native alone (NH)	9	26	14	1.10%	3.49%	3.41%
Asian alone (NH)	4	3	5	0.49%	0.40%	1.22%
Pacific Islander alone (NH)	0	1	2	0.00%	0.13%	0.49%
Other race alone (NH)	4	6	0	0.49%	0.81%	0.00%
Mixed race or multiracial (NH)	48	11	7	5.87%	1.48%	1.71%
Hispanic or Latino (any race)	62	75	51	7.58%	10.07%	12.44%
Total	818	745	410	100.00%	100.00%	100.00%

=== 2020 census ===
As of the 2020 census, there were 410 people, 15 households, and 15 families residing in the village. The population density was 453.04 inhabitants per square mile (174.9/km^{2}). There were 46 housing units at an average density of 50.83 per square mile (19.6/km^{2}). The racial makeup of the village was 56.59% White, 24.15% African American, 3.41% Native American, 1.22% Asian, 0.49% Pacific Islander, 11.71% from some other races and 2.44% from two or more races. Hispanic or Latino people of any race were 12.44% of the population.

=== 2010 census ===
As of the 2010 census, there were 745 people, 6 households, and 2 families residing in the village. The population density was 566.54 inhabitants per square mile (218.7/km^{2}). There were 15 housing units at an average density of 11.41 per square mile (4.4/km^{2}). The racial makeup of the village was 66.04% White, 26.17% African American, 3.49% Native American, 0.40% Asian, 0.13% Pacific Islander, 1.61% from some other races and 2.15% from two or more races. Hispanic or Latino people of any race were 10.07% of the population.

There were 6 households 16.7% had children under the age of 18 living with them, 33.3% were married couples living together, and 66.7% were non-families. 66.7% of households were one person and 16.7% were one person aged 65 or older. The average household size was 3.17 and the average family size was 3.00.

The median age in the village was 16.7 years. 72.8% of residents were under the age of 18; 10.9% were between the ages of 18 and 24; 13.2% were from 25 to 44; 2.8% were from 45 to 64; and 0.1% were 65 or older. The gender makeup of the village was 57.2% male and 42.8% female.

=== 2000 census ===
As of the 2000 census, there were 818 people, 57 households, and 53 families residing in the village. The population density was 589.72 inhabitants per square mile (227.7/km^{2}). There were 58 housing units at an average density of 41.81 per square mile (16.1/km^{2}). The racial makeup of the village was 66.01% White, 21.15% African American, 1.34% Native American, 0.49% Asian, 0.00% Pacific Islander, 5.01% from some other races and 5.99% from two or more races. Hispanic or Latino people of any race were 7.58% of the population.

There were 57 households 68.4% had children under the age of 18 living with them, 93.0% were married couples living together, and 7.0% were non-families. 7.0% of households were one person and 5.3% were one person aged 65 or older. The average household size was 3.32 and the average family size was 3.47.

The age distribution was 78.9% under the age of 18, 8.9% from 18 to 24, 11.0% from 25 to 44, 0.7% from 45 to 64, and 0.5% 65 or older. The median age was 16 years. For every 100 females, there were 219.5 males. For every 100 females age 18 and over there were 150.7 males.

The median household income was $51,442, and the median family income was $51,944. Males had a median income of $31,563 versus $21,042 for females. The per capita income for the village was $3,048. None of the families and 6.1% of the population were living below the poverty line, including none under 18 and none of those over 64.

== Education ==
The village of Boys Town contains its own private school system, Boys Town Schools. This school system consists of both a middle school and high school (housed in the same building, the Boys Town Education Center), as well as a Day School, all located on the main Boys Town Home Campus. In addition, Boys Town operates a Day School located in Duncan, Nebraska.

== See also ==
- List of municipalities in Nebraska
