= Chalco Hills Recreation Area =

Recreation area in northwestern Sarpy County, Nebraska

- Location within Nebraska
- Location: Sarpy County, Nebraska, United States
- Nearest city: Omaha, Nebraska
- Coordinates: 41°10′14″N 96°9′19″W
- Area: 1,186 acres (4.80 km^{2})
- Governing body: U.S. Army Corps of Engineers

Chalco Hills Recreation Area is located in northwestern Sarpy County, Nebraska, and approximately 12 miles (19 km) west of downtown Omaha. Chalco Hills consists of 1,186 acres (4.80 km^{2}) of which 246 acres (1.00 km^{2}) is covered by Wehrspann Lake, an artificial reservoir. The recreation area was opened in 1988 as part of Papio-Missouri River Natural Resources District efforts to provide flood control and improve recreation opportunities. The Dam was built by the U.S. Army Corps of Engineers and the recreation area is managed by the Natural Resources District.

== Recreation ==
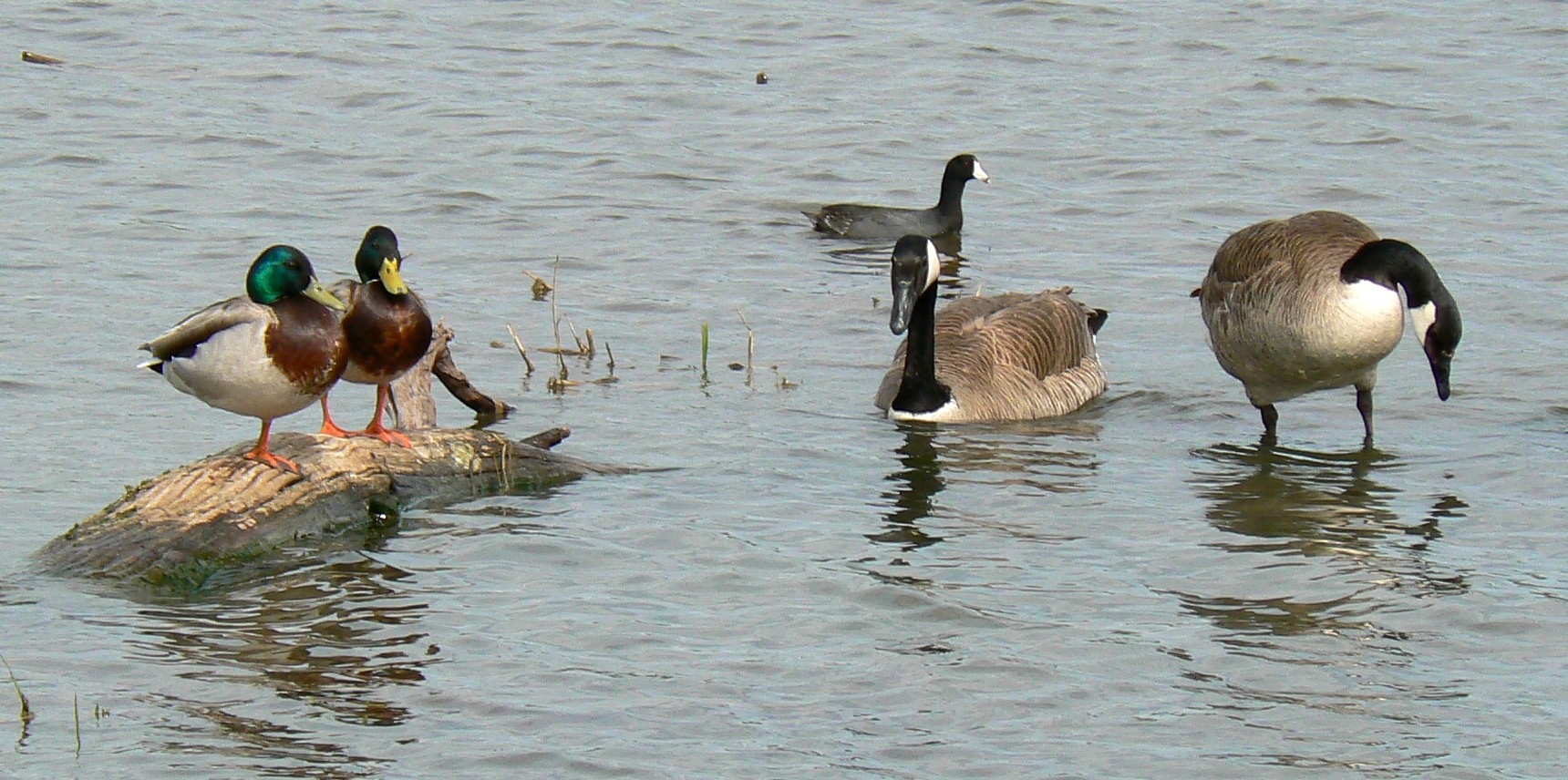
Commonly seen waterfowl at Chalco Hills includes mallards (left), Canada goose (right) and American coots (back)

There are seven picnic areas and several have covered pavilions, the largest of which can accommodate up to 100 people and can be reserved. Seven miles (11 km) of walking trails encircle Wehrspann Lake. Several soccer fields and one baseball field, along with two playgrounds adjacent to picnic areas are easily reached from nearby parking areas. The soccer fields are also used as launch sites for hot-air balloons and radio controlled airplanes. The area is used for cross-country running events during the fall, and cross-country skiing and ice fishing are popular in the winter. Fishing is more popular in the warmer seasons, and there is parking for 30 trailers. Motorized boats must comply with the no-wake regulation by maintaining speeds under 5 miles (8.0 km) per hour.

A "fairy garden" exists at Chalco Hills near picnic shelter D.

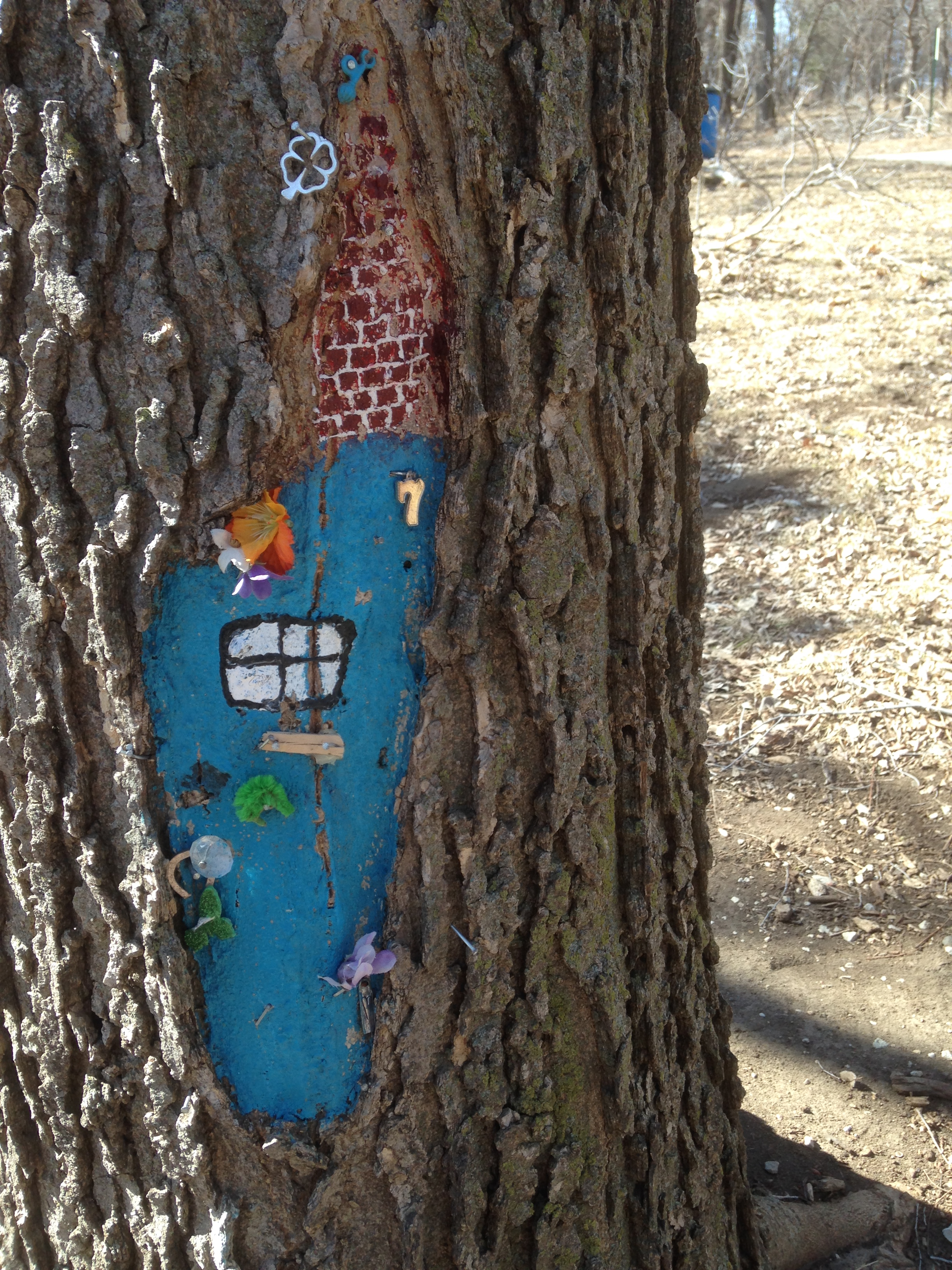
Photo of a painted door in a damaged area of a tree trunk in Chalco Hills Recreation Area. It is part of a Fairy Garden. CapturedMarch 8, 2015 at 2:37 PM

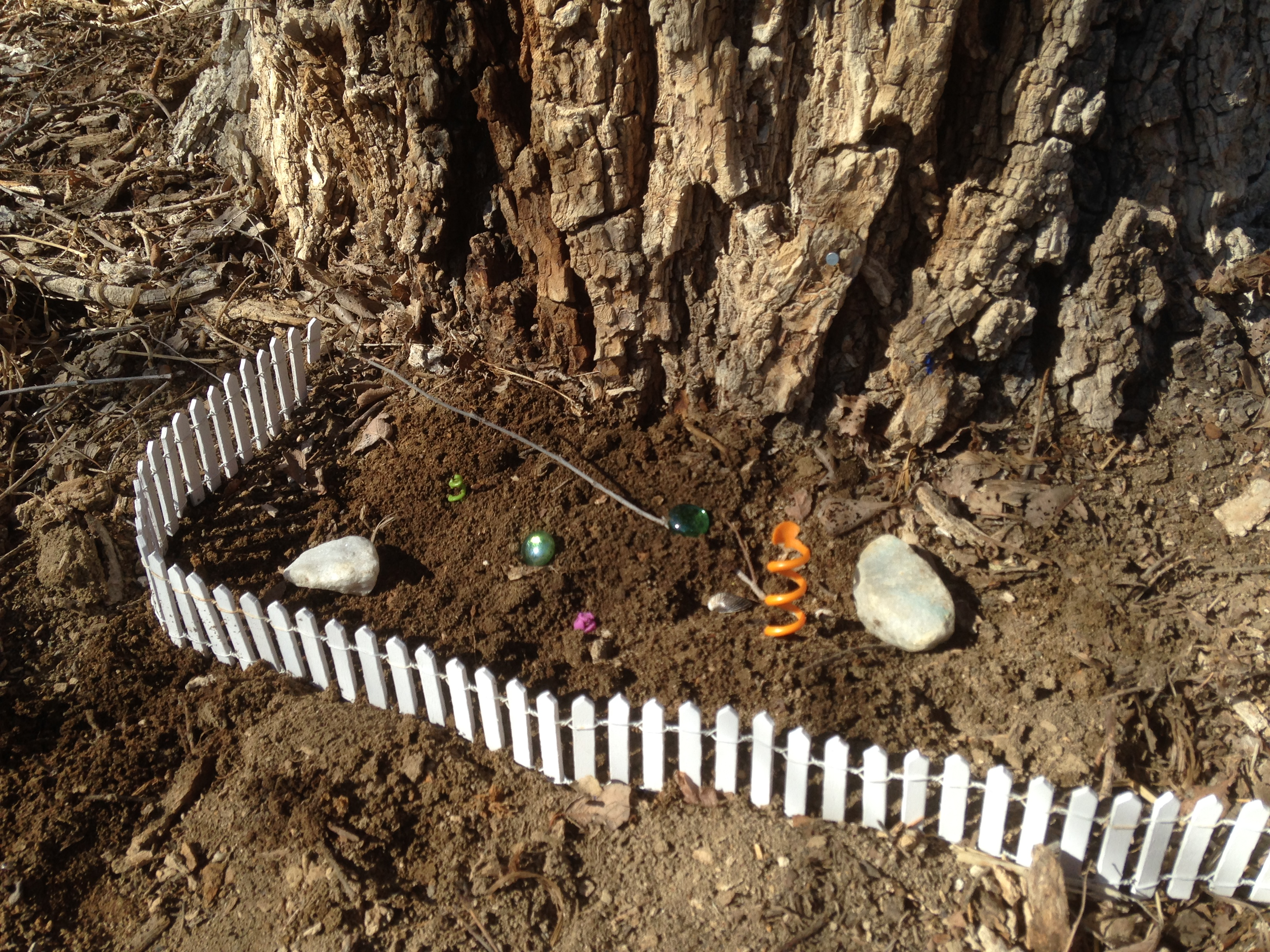
A miniature fence and scene at the base of a tree trunk in Chalco Hills Recreation Area, part of a Fairy Garden.

== Wehrspann Lake ==
Wehrspann Lake is a man-made reservoir that covers 246 acres (1.00 km^{2}) and is up to 30 feet (9.1 m) deep. It is located on tributary streams that flow into Papillion Creek. A "universally accessible" fishing pier and boat launch provide fishing access to Wehrspann Lake. On the southeast side of the lake, a waterfowl viewing platform permits closer observation of the numerous species of birds that frequent the area. The lake is stocked with a variety of fish species including bluegill, channel and blue catfish, crappie, largemouth bass, walleye, and carp.

== Natural resources ==
Chalco Hills also has an arboretum of native plants of the region including prairie grasses, trees and flowers. Much of the recreation area has been replanted with native species of trees and grasses. The recreation area is popular for bird watching and is frequented by a number of species throughout the year. A small herd of white-tailed deer also reside in the area.

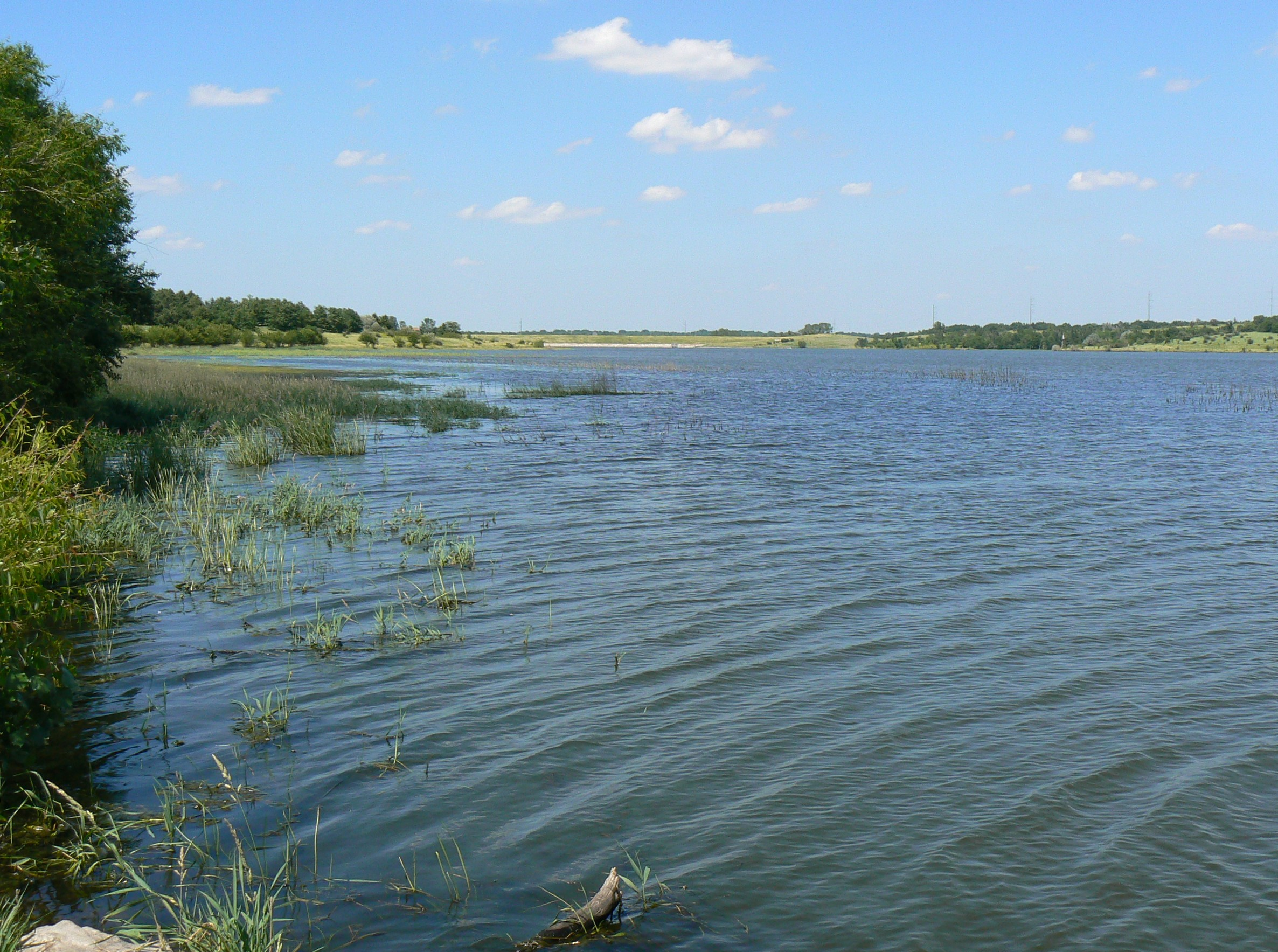
Wehrspann Lake is man made reservoir impounded by a dam. The dam is visible in the distance.

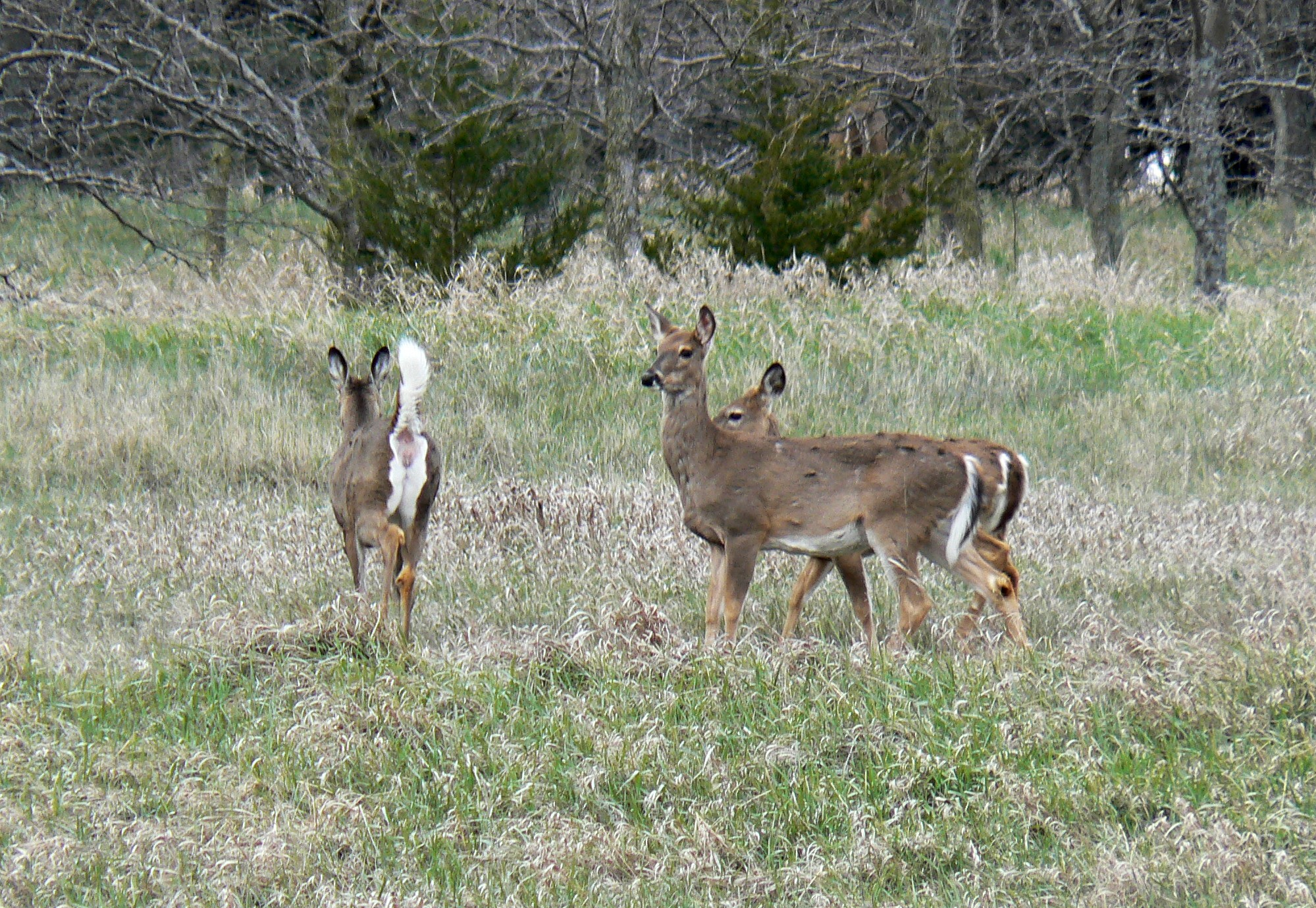
White tailed deer

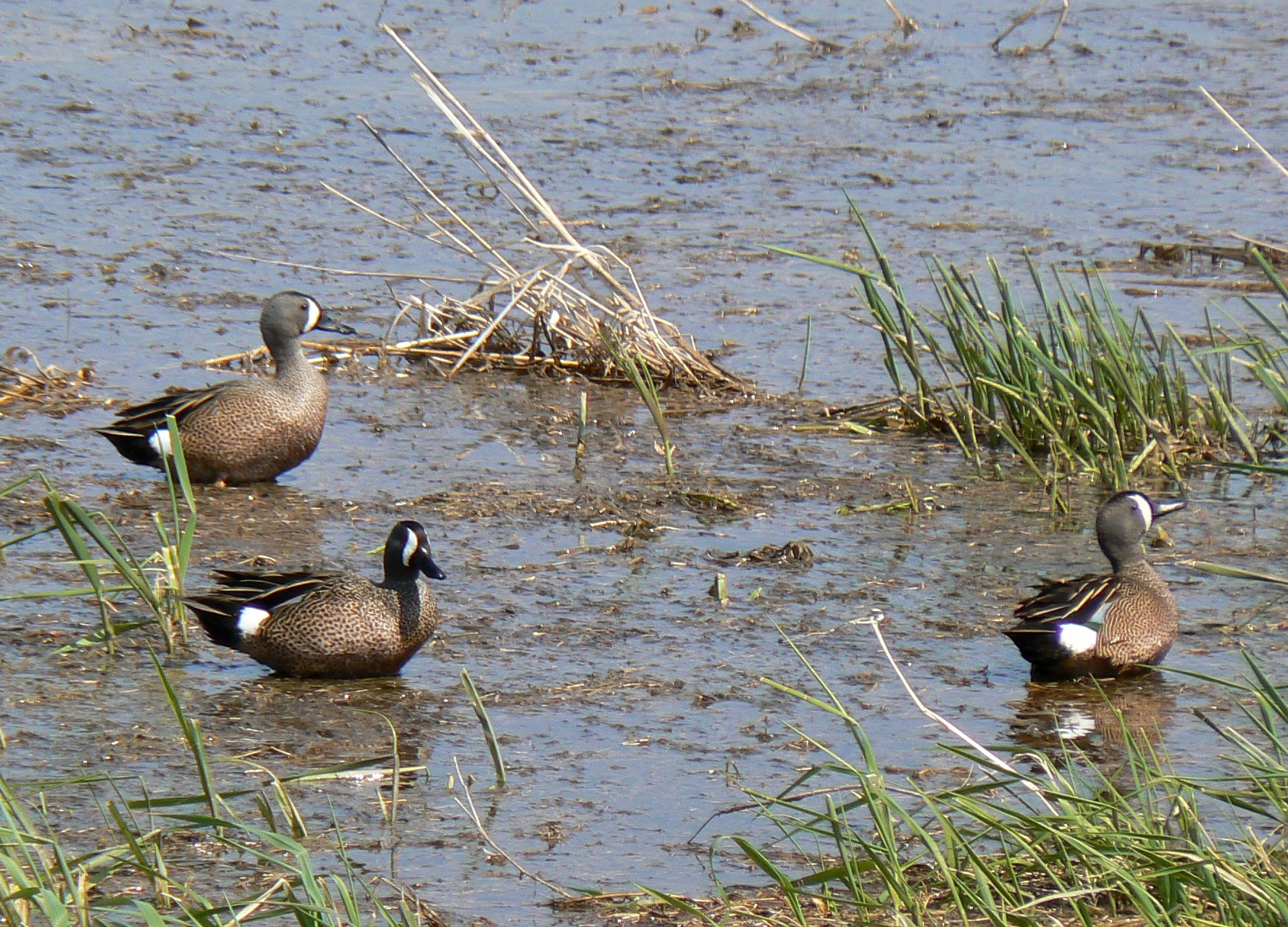
Blue-winged teals in marshes of Wehrspann Lake
