= Debolt, Nebraska =

Unincorporated community in Nebraska, United States

- Unincorporated Community
- Location within Nebraska Location within the United States
- Coordinates: 41.3°N 96°W
- Country: United States
- State: Nebraska
- County: Douglas

Debolt is an unincorporated community in Douglas County, Nebraska, United States, located approximately seven miles northwest of Omaha.

A post office called Debolt or De Bolt (two words) was established in 1892, and remained in operation until it was discontinued in 1899. The railroad stop on the Chicago & Northwestern line was called De Bolt Place.

== See also ==
- History of Omaha, Nebraska
