= Boys Town (organization) =

Nonprofit organization based in US

- Formation: December 12, 1917; 108 years ago
- Founder: Edward J. Flanagan
- Founded at: Boys Town, Nebraska
- Type: 501(c)(3) nonprofit
- Headquarters: Boys Town, Nebraska
- Website: www.boystown.org

Boys Town, officially Father Flanagan's Boys' Home, is a nonprofit organization based in Boys Town, Nebraska, dedicated to caring for children and families, founded by Father Edward J. Flanagan.

== History ==
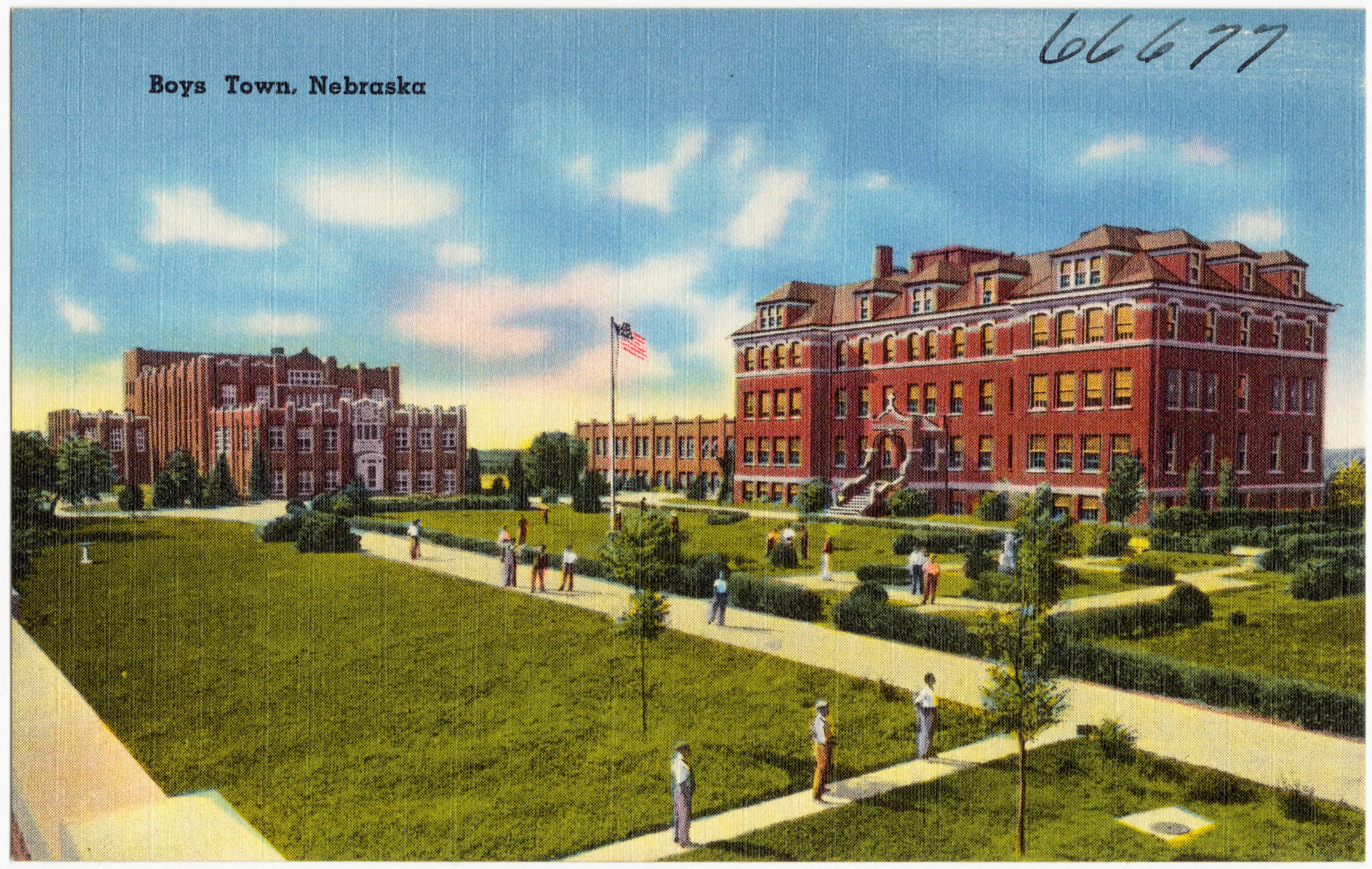
Boys Town, Nebraska

Boys Town was founded on December 12, 1917, as an orphanage for boys. Originally known as "The City of Little Men", the organization was begun by Edward J. Flanagan, a Roman Catholic priest, while he worked in the Diocese of Omaha. Using a loan of $90, he first rented a home at 25th and Dodge streets, in Omaha, to care for five boys. From these beginnings, the City of Little Men developed new juvenile care methods in 20th-century America, emphasizing "social preparation as a model for public boys' homes worldwide". Flanagan is now a candidate for beatification.

=== 1917–1921: Early growth and move to Overlook Farm ===
Boys Town quickly grew from the original five boys living in a home in downtown Omaha in 1917 to more than 100 boys by early 1918. The increase required a relocation in 1919 to South Omaha. Flanagan had been contending with criticism about having kids of different races, religions, nationalities, and backgrounds all living together under the same roof. Mounting societal tensions and the need for even more space led to Flanagan’s 1921 decision to relocate Boys Town to Overlook Farm.

In 1921, Father Flanagan purchased Overlook Farm on the outskirts of Omaha and moved his boys' home there. The move to Overlook Farm was a major step in Father Flanagan's plan to create a developed community. In time, the Home became known as the Village of Boys Town. By the 1930s, hundreds of boys lived at the Village, which was developed to include a school, dormitories, and administration buildings. Adapting the "Junior Republic" model, the boys elected their own government, including a mayor, council, and commissioners.

=== 1930s–1960s ===
Franklin D. Roosevelt, then a presidential candidate, visited Boys Town with his wife Eleanor in November 1932, remarking on the beauty of the site and its purpose.

In 1936, the community of Boys Town was designated as an official village in the State of Nebraska.

By the late 1930s, Boys Town's development and staff efforts to court public support had made it the subject of many newspaper and magazine articles. In 1938, producers from MGM Studios traveled to Boys Town to discuss the prospects of a movie about the Home. A few months later, actors Spencer Tracy and Mickey Rooney, along with a 61-member crew, arrived at Boys Town to begin ten days of on-location filming. Tracy won an Academy Award for his role.

In 1943, Boys Town adopted as its image and logo a picture of a boy carrying a younger boy on his back, captioned "He Ain't Heavy, He's My Brother", a phrase originating with the United Free Church of Scotland. A statue with an older boy carrying a younger girl, reflecting the same sentiments, is located at Boys Town in Nebraska, where it is referred to as "The Work Continues" statue.

When Flanagan suffered a fatal heart attack in Berlin, Germany in 1948, the Archbishop of Omaha, Gerald T. Bergan, named Monsignor Nicholas H. Wegner as Boys Town's second executive director. The best records available indicate that the home's population peaked at 880, in the 1960s.

=== Fundraising controversy and Wegner's resignation ===
Boys Town's fundraising practices drew scrutiny in 1972 after the Omaha Sun, a local newspaper, investigated the nonprofit after a tip from local Omaha businessman Warren Buffett. The charity was found to have an endowment of over $191 million in 1971, enough to place it at #230 on the Fortune 500, yet continued to fundraise even with a shrinking population and no new expansion projects. Wegner was forced to resign and temporarily halted its fundraising activities. The Omaha Sun received the Pulitzer Prize for Local Investigative Specialized Reporting in 1973 for the story. On October 11, 1973, Robert P. Hupp was named the third national executive director.

=== Child prostitution ring, association and coverup accusations ===
In 1979, Boys Town developed close ties with the Franklin Community Federal Credit Union (FCFCU), headed by Lawrence E. King Jr., who was later convicted in 1991 on fraud charges related to embezzling $40 million from credit union accounts. Boys Town was reported to have numerous accounts with FCFCU, which were managed only by select book keepers.

During the decade-long association between Boys Town and the now-defunct credit union, youths who had initially been sent to work for the bank started speaking up with accusations of extensive sexual abuse. These reports alleged that King was head of a vast child prostitution ring with a clientele list that included numerous prominent members of society, reaching as high as the U.S. White House. It has also been speculated that King's embezzled funds were used to finance this illegal operation.

In 1986, a detailed report of abuses that named both victims and perpetrators was submitted by a Boys Town social worker to the organization's Chief Executive, Father Val Peter. This represented a violation of state statutes requiring accusations of this nature to be reported directly to authorities, such as Child Protective Services or police. Father Peter admitted to conducting his own investigation, after which he dismissed the accusations as unfounded, though he also claimed to have no knowledge of the report submitted by the social worker.

In 1988, these accusations came to the attention of the Nebraska state Foster Care Review Board. Over a two year investigation, extensive information was compiled from various sources including educators, social workers, and even a correctional officer in one case. The resulting collection of findings, described as being extensive, was submitted to authorities. Carol Stitt, Executive Director of the Foster Care Review Board at the time, said that "nothing happened" after their report was submitted. She stated, "For me, it was very clear: the case was not investigated and not pursued because of the accused perpetrators."

Ultimately, a Grand Jury failed to indict Lawrence King on any charges related to sexual abuse.

== Transition to Family Home programs ==
In late 1974, Boys Town hired its first "Family-Teachers", a married couple who would begin caring for a small group of youth in a former cottage being converted into a "Family Home". Three other couples were hired soon after. That core group worked with other staff members to develop formal training materials for the Family-Teachers who were being recruited. As new couples were trained, they moved into newly built homes and converted cottages. By the end of 1975, the last of the dormitories was closed and the transition to the Boys Town Family Home Program was complete.

=== Boys Town admits girls (1979) ===
The executive director Robert Hupp had experience working with troubled girls. He had served from 1946 to 1950 as chaplain, teacher, and athletic coach for a girls' home run by the Sisters of the Good Shepherd Convent in Omaha. In 1979, a few girls were admitted to live in a Family Home on the main campus. More followed and by 1985, twenty-six girls were citizens of Boys Town.

== National Historic Landmark ==
- Father Flanagan's Boys' Home
- U.S. National Register of Historic Places
- U.S. National Historic Landmark District
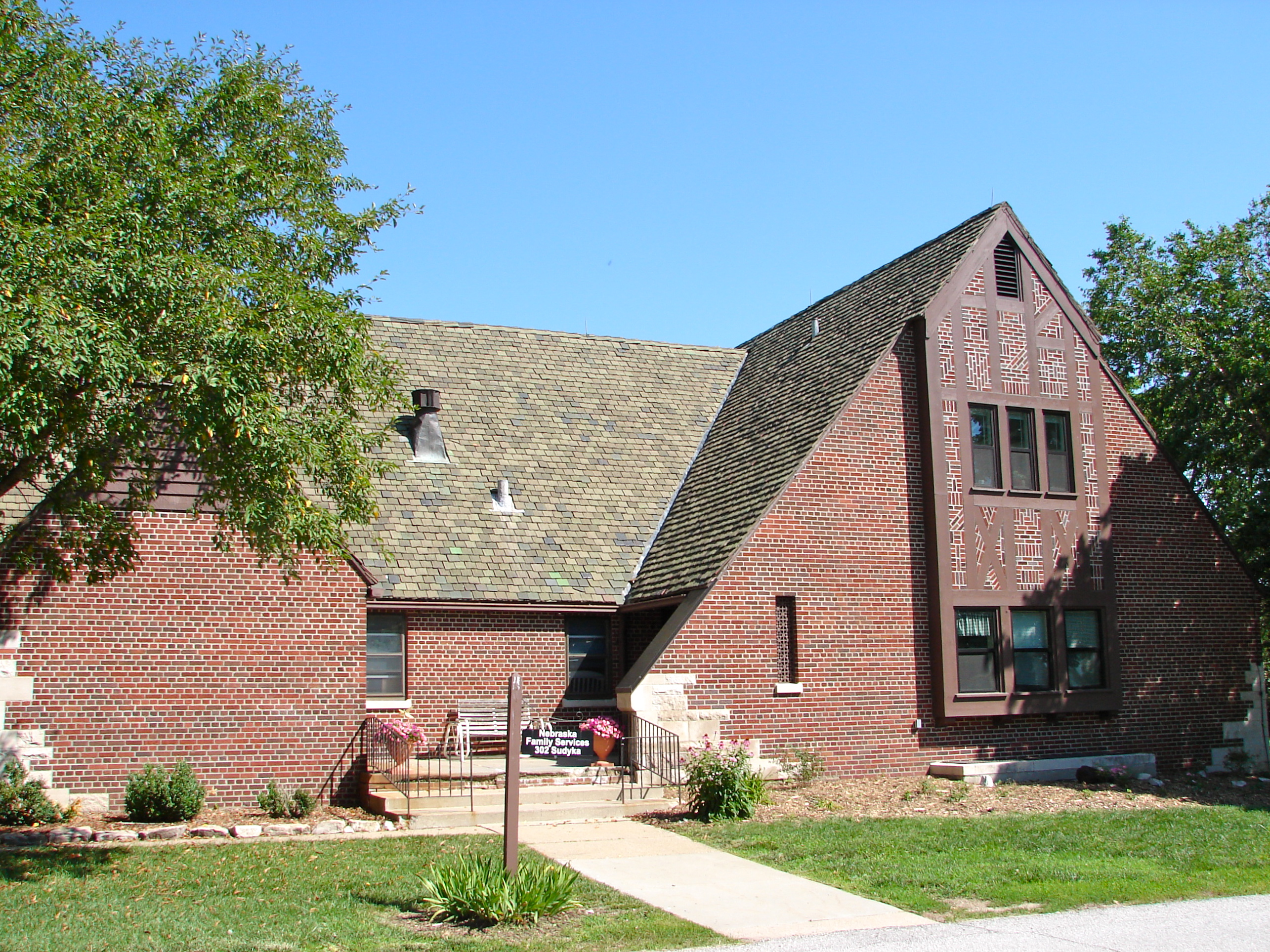

- Location within Nebraska Location within the United States
- Location: Boys Town, Nebraska
- Coordinates: 41°15′52″N 96°7′58″W
- Area: 1,310 acres (5.3 km^{2})
- Built: 1917
- Architect: Leo A. Daly Construction
- Architectural style: Tudor Revival
- NRHP reference No.: 85002439

Significant dates
- Added to NRHP: February 4, 1985
- Designated NHLD: February 4, 1985

The national headquarters of Boys Town is in the village of Boys Town, Nebraska; the village was listed on the National Register of Historic Places and designated a National Historic Landmark on February 4, 1985.

Facilities include the Hall of History, dedicated to the history of Boys Town; the restored home of Father Flanagan; the Dowd Memorial Chapel, completed in 1941, and the Chambers Protestant Chapel; the "Garden of the Bible", established in 1989, and the Leon Myers Stamp Center. The latter provides historical stamp-collecting exhibits and sells donated stamps to provide support for Boys Town programs.

It has a summer camp on West Lake Okoboji, located near West Okoboji, Iowa.

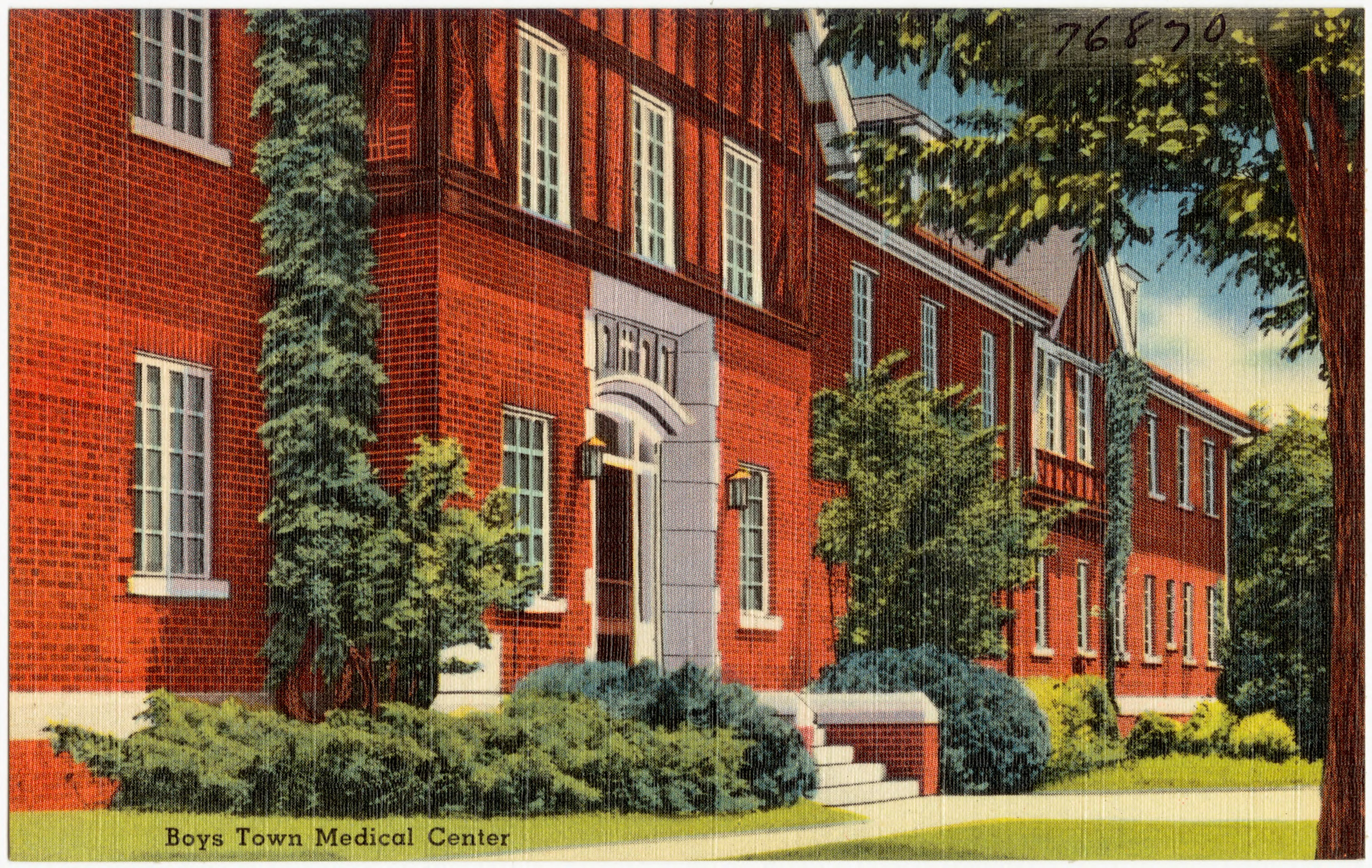
Boys Town Medical Center

== Hospitals and clinics ==
In 1977, Boys Town founded and continues to operate the Boys Town National Research Hospital, located at 555 N. 30th Street in Omaha. Its sister hospital, Boys Town National Research Hospital – West, is operated on the Boys Town campus. The nonprofit organization also operates several medical clinics in Nebraska, and one in Iowa.

== National locations ==
Boys Town has nine sites across the United States, in Central Florida, North Florida, South Florida, Louisiana, Nebraska, Iowa, New England, Nevada, and Washington, D.C.
