= Jeremy Slechta =

American football player (born 1980)

No. 79
- Position: Defensive tackle

Personal information
- Born: May 12, 1980 (age 46); La Vista, Nebraska, U.S.
- Listed height: 6 ft 6 in (1.98 m)

Career information
- College: Nebraska

Career history
- 2002: Philadelphia Eagles
- 2003: Houston Texans
- Stats at Pro Football Reference

Jeremy James Slechta (born May 12, 1980) is an American former professional football player who was a defensive lineman in the National Football League (NFL) for the Philadelphia Eagles and Houston Texans. He played college football for the Nebraska Cornhuskers.

== Early life ==
He went to Papillion-La Vista Senior High School in Papillion, Nebraska. He played college football at the University of Nebraska–Lincoln.
