= Nebraska Highway 370 =

State highway in Nebraska, U.S.

State Highway 370
- Strategic Air Command Memorial Highway
- N-370 highlighted in red

Route information
- Maintained by NDOT
- Length: 16.16 mi (26.01 km)

Major junctions
- West end: US 6 / N-31 in Gretna
- I-80 southwest of Omaha
- East end: US 75 in Bellevue

Location
- Country: United States
- State: Nebraska
- Counties: Sarpy

Highway system
- Nebraska State Highway System; Interstate; US; State; Link; Spur; State Spurs; Recreation
← US 283	→ US 385

Nebraska Highway 370 (N-370) is an east–west state highway in eastern Nebraska that is 15.98 miles (25.72 km) in length. Southwest of Omaha, it begins at U.S. Route 6 and Nebraska Highway 31 in Gretna and ends at the U.S. Route 75 interchange in Bellevue. Highway 370 is the main east–west road in Sarpy County, which serves the southern Omaha suburbs. It is known as the Strategic Air Command Memorial Highway; during the Cold War, nearby Offutt Air Force Base was SAC headquarters for over four decades.

== Route description ==
Nebraska Highway 370 begins at US 6 and N-31 in Gretna, running east. At Sapp Brothers Drive, N-370 becomes an expressway. Shortly after that, it intersects Interstate 80. One mile later, there is an interchange with Nebraska Highway 50, which is 144th Street. About a mile later is Werner Park on the north, home of the Omaha Storm Chasers, the Kansas City Royals' Triple-A affiliate in the International League.

Highway 370 continues east as an expressway and meets Nebraska Highway 85, 84th Street/Washington Street, in Papillion. It passes through the southern portion of Papillion and at about 48th Street, enters Bellevue; after two miles (3.2 km), it ends at U.S. Route 75, the Kennedy Expressway, and then becomes Harlan Drive.

== History ==
Prior to 2014, the highway continued east along the remainder of Harlan Drive, turned south at its intersection with Galvin Road, then turned east as Mission Avenue through Olde Towne Bellevue. It then connected with Iowa Highway 370 at the Bellevue Bridge. The Iowa highway was turned over to Mills County upon completion of the U.S. Route 34 bridge six miles (10 km) southeast of Bellevue, and the Nebraska state-maintained length was shortened to its present terminus.

== Major intersections ==
The entire route is in Sarpy County.

Location	mi	km	Destinations	Notes
Gretna	0.000	0.000	US 6 / N-31 to I-80	Western terminus; road continues as West Gruenther Road
Richland VIII Precinct	4.19	6.74	I-80 – Lincoln, Omaha	Interchange; I-80 exit 439
Papillion	5.21	8.38	N-50 (144th Street) – West Omaha	Interchange
Papillion	10.37	16.69	N-85 north (Washington Street) – La Vista	Southern terminus of N-85; Washington Street south serves CHI Health Midlands Hospital
Bellevue	15.77– 16.16	25.38– 26.01	US 75 (Kennedy Freeway) / Arboretum Drive – Plattsmouth, Omaha, Bellevue Schools, Offutt Welcome Center	Interchange; eastern terminus; road continues as Harlan Drive
1.000 mi = 1.609 km; 1.000 km = 0.621 mi

== Points of interest ==
- Shadow Lake Towne Center in Papillion
