= Nebraska Highway 85 =

Former state highway in Nebraska, United States

State Highway 85

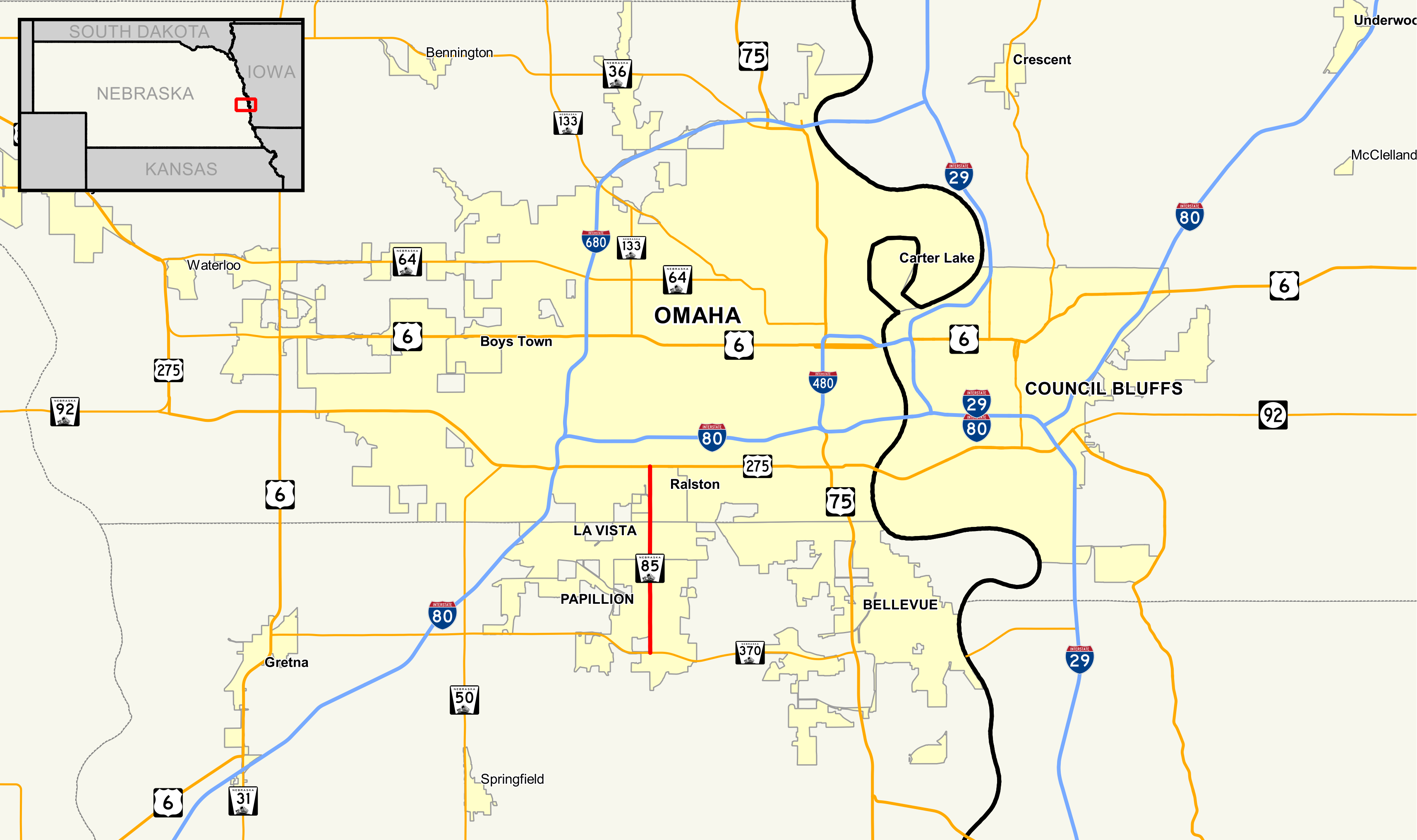
- Nebraska Highway 85 highlighted in red

Route information
- Maintained by NDOT
- Length: 5.01 mi (8.06 km)
- Existed: 1960–2020

Major junctions
- South end: N-370 in Papillion
- North end: US 275 / N-92 in Omaha and Ralston

Location
- Country: United States
- State: Nebraska
- Counties: Sarpy, Douglas

Highway system
- Nebraska State Highway System; Interstate; US; State; Link; Spur; State Spurs; Recreation
← N-84	→ N-87

Nebraska Highway 85 (N-85) was a highway in the Omaha Metro Area, United States. It began at Nebraska Highway 370 in Papillion and ended at U.S. Highway 275 and Nebraska Highway 92 on the border of Omaha and Ralston. It was a four-lane highway for its entire length.

== Route description ==
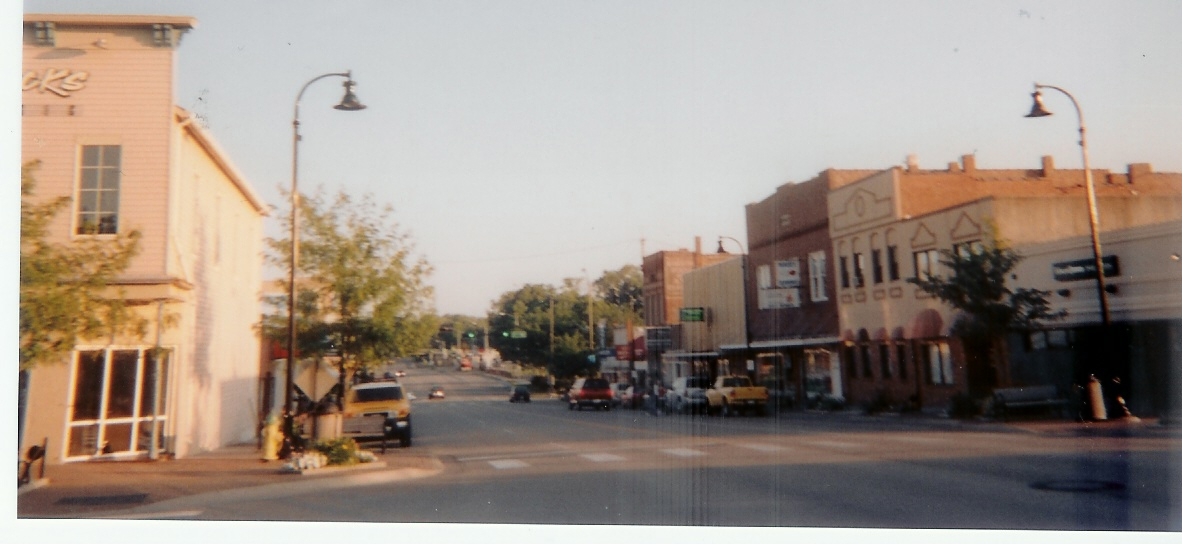
Nebraska Highway 85 in downtown Papillion

N-85 began at an intersection with N-370 in Papillion. In Papillion, the street was named Washington Street. At 6th Street in Papillion, N-85 became a divided highway, which it remained for the rest of its route. After passing Giles Road, it entered LaVista, and after passing Harrison Street, it entered Ralston. After its intersection with Madison Street, N-85 formed the west border of Ralston for most of the rest of the way, and with Omaha. At US 275 and N-92, which is L Street, the highway ended.

== History ==
In 2019, a pedestrian was killed while trying to cross N-85 in Papillion. This led to the communities along N-85 to ask NDOT to transfer ownership of the highway to the communities. Transferring the highway would allow each community to make changes to the roadway without having to involve NDOT.

== Major intersections ==
County	Location	mi	km	Destinations	Notes
Sarpy	Papillion	0.00	0.00	N-370 (Strategic Air Command Memorial Highway) to I-80	Southern terminus; road continues as Washington Street
Douglas	Ralston–Omaha line	5.01	8.06	L Street (US 275 / N-92)	Northern terminus; road continues as 84th Street
1.000 mi = 1.609 km; 1.000 km = 0.621 mi
