= Papillion-La Vista Senior High School =

Location
- 303 E. Cary Street; Papillion, Nebraska 68046; United States; 41.17°N 96.04°W

Information
- Type: Public
- Established: 1876, 1971 (current)
- Principal: Jason Ryan
- Teaching staff: 115.18 (FTE)
- Grades: 9–12
- Enrollment: 1,873 (2023–2024)
- Student to teacher ratio: 16.26
- Colors: Maroon, white and gold
- Team name: Monarchs
- Rival: Papillion-La Vista South
- Website: https://plhs.plcschools.org/

Papillion-La Vista Senior High School, often referred to as Papio, PLHS, or ‘’’Monarchs’’’ is located in Papillion, Nebraska, United States, a suburb southwest of Omaha. Operated by the Papillion-La Vista Public School District, its school colors are maroon and gold, and the mascot is a monarch.

== History ==
The Papillion-La Vista Public Schools District originated well over a century ago. It is reported to be the first school district to be established in Nebraska Territory, in 1872.

Papillion High School dates back to September 1876. Originally housed in a single brick building at the corner of Halleck & Adams Streets, Papillion's only school served students in all 12 grades. In 1893 the school moved to a new brick building at 420 S. Washington Street, the present site of the district offices. The city continued to grow, and in February 1957, Papillion High School opened in a new building across Washington Street (presently Papillion Junior High) to students in grades 7–12.

Directly north of Papillion, the city of La Vista incorporated in 1960 and presented no education system. The students of this new development area had been incorporated into the Papillion School District, and Papillion's steady growth continued. By September 1969, voters in the district had passed a bond issue to build a new high school facility at 84th Street and East Centennial Road; a similar bond issue the preceding year had been defeated. The high school moved north to its present location 55 years ago in August 1971, serving students in grades 9 through 12. La Vista was officially added to the district in 1987 and the high school's name was formally changed to Papillion-La Vista.

=== Second high school ===
Continued population growth resulted in the construction of Papillion-La Vista South High School (PLSHS) in southwest Papillion, which opened in August 2003. Because of overcrowding prior to this, Papillion-La Vista was a senior high school (grades 10–12) for several years, with freshman remaining at the two junior high schools in the district. With the opening of PLSHS, the freshman class was added back to both high schools.

== Popular culture ==
The 1999 film Election, starring Matthew Broderick and Reese Witherspoon, was shot mainly at Papillion-La Vista in autumn 1997. The high school had actual classes going on during much of the filming, and the background noises during much of the film are actual teachers and their students in nearby rooms.

== Sports ==
- Football - Class A Champions 1990 and 1996;Runner-up 1986, Runner-up 1987, Runner-up 1995 and Runner-up 1997
- Softball - 13 Class A Championships, 2 Runners-up from 1995-2010 (including 10 straight)
- Volleyball - Class A Champions - 2000, 2001, 2002, 2007, and 2008
- Girls' track and field - Class A State Champions - 1997, 1998, 1999
- Boys' golf - Class A Champion - 1999
- Boys' tennis - Class A Champion - 1978
- Boys' basketball - Class A Champion - 1993, Runner-up 2013, 1971
- Boys' swimming - Class A Champion - 2003
- Boys' soccer - Class A Champion - 1991
- Wrestling - Class A Champion - 2001
- Boys' All-Nebraska All-Sport Award -2012
- Cross country
- Baseball - 1997, 1998
- Girls' tennis - 2015

== Notable alumni ==
- Jordy Bahl, college softball player for the Nebraska Cornhuskers
- Kenzo Cotton, All American and Southeastern Conference Champion sprinter at the University of Arkansas.
- Merle Dandridge, Broadway actress and the voice of Alyx Vance in the award-winning action game Half-Life 2 and its sequels, Episode One and Episode Two
- Allan Evridge, former Kansas State and Wisconsin quarterback
- Matty Lewis, Musician and lead singer of the band Zebrahead
- Luke Lindenmeyer, college football tight end for the Nebraska Cornhuskers
- Gina Mancuso, Gatorade Volleyball player of the year
- Carlos Martínez, professional football player, formerly with the Dallas Cowboys
- Scarlett Miller (née Herring), engineering professor
- Jeremy Slechta, former professional football player with the Philadelphia Eagles and Houston Texans
- Becca Swanson, nicknamed "the strongest woman in the world" for lifting more weight than any other woman in the world; squatting over 800 lbs, benchpressing over 500 lbs, and total lifting (squatting, benchpressing and deadlifting) more than 2000 lbs
- Allison Weston, 2000 Olympic Volleyball Captain and University of Nebraska Volleyball, All-State Nebraska High School volleyball, basketball, and soccer
