= Allan Evridge =

American football player (born 1985)

Allan Everidge
No. 12, 4
- Position: Quarterback

Personal information
- Born: June 24, 1985 (age 41); Germany
- Listed height: 6 ft 2 in (1.88 m)
- Listed weight: 212 lb (96 kg)

Career information
- High school: Papillion-La Vista (Papillion, Nebraska)
- College: Kansas State (2004–2005); Wisconsin (2007–2008)
- Stats at ESPN

Allan Evridge (born June 24, 1985) is a former American football quarterback. He played college football for the Kansas State Wildcats football team from 2004 to 2005 and the Wisconsin Badgers football team from 2007 to 2008.

== College career ==
=== Wisconsin ===
In 2008, Evridge was a surprise starter at Wisconsin following the graduation of previous quarterback Tyler Donovan. He seemed to get off to a good start in games against Akron, Marshall, and Fresno State, and got the Badgers off to a 19–0 lead over Michigan in Ann Arbor at the end of the first half. However, Evridge's disastrous second half (where he fumbled in the Michigan redzone, threw an interception for a touchdown, and failed to connect with receivers repeatedly) led directly to Michigan points and Wisconsin suffered a giant 27–25 upset. Against Ohio State the next week, Evridge threw an interception to Buckeye cornerback Malcolm Jenkins when Wisconsin had the chance to win or tie the game down 20–17. After an atrocious performance against Penn State in which he completed 2 passes on 10 attempts with an interception, Wisconsin head coach Bret Bielema benched Evridge for the rest of the season in favor of backup Dustin Sherer. Evridge would score the only touchdown of the game on a 5 yard run, but his poor performances all but doomed Wisconsin to an 0–3 start in Big Ten play. The Badgers finished the year 7–6 overall, with a 3–5 record in Big Ten play.
