= Bellevue Bridge =

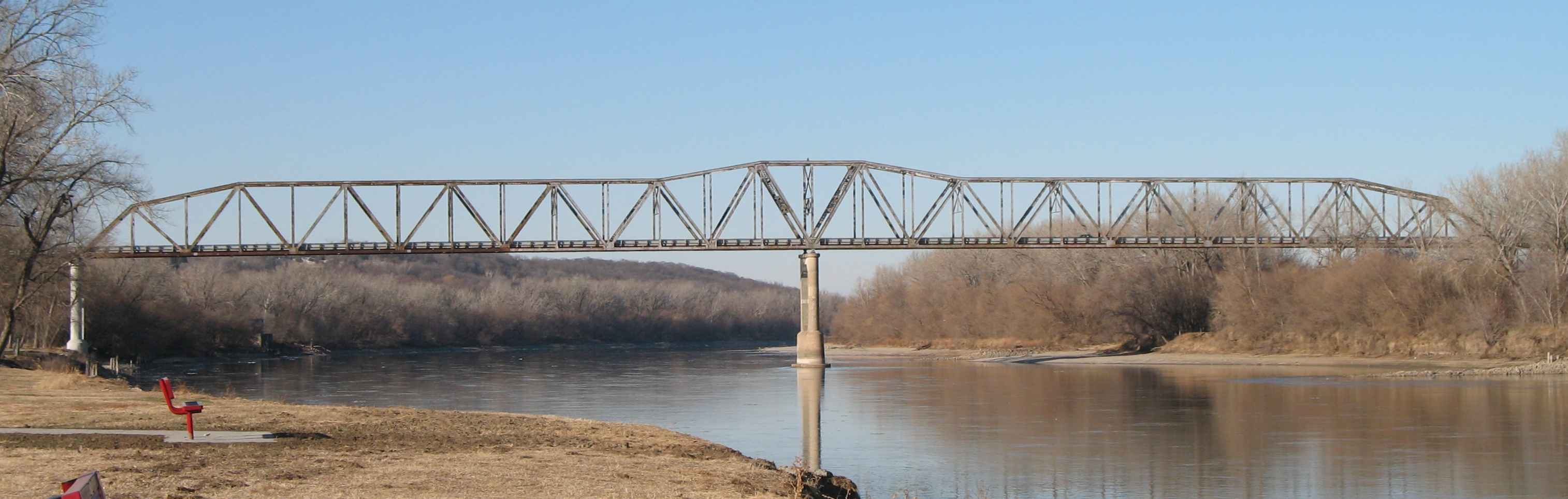
- Coordinates: 41°08′19″N 95°52′45″W
- Carries: Mill County Road H10
- Crosses: Missouri River
- Locale: Bellevue, Nebraska
- Official name: Grand Army of the Republic Bridge
- Other name(s): Bellevue Toll Bridge

Characteristics
- Design: continuous truss
- Material: Steel

History
- Opened: 1950

Statistics
- Toll: $1

The Bellevue Bridge (known as the Bellevue Toll Bridge and officially called the Grand Army of the Republic Bridge) is a continuous truss bridge over the Missouri River connecting Mills County, Iowa and Sarpy County, Nebraska at Bellevue, Nebraska.

The bridge formerly connected Nebraska Highway 370 and Iowa Highway 370. Both routes were truncated upon the completion of the US 34 bridge downstream.

The bridge was built in 1950 by the Bellevue Bridge Commission at a cost of $2.8 million (equivalent to $36.6 million in 2024). The bridge charges $1 tolls for cars and is 20 feet (6.1 m) wide. The bridge is considered obsolete, however there are plans to replace it in the coming decade. Various government entities have sparred over ownership, due to the expense of maintenance, after the initial bonds were paid off in 2000. The issue has been temporarily resolved since the Bridge Commission has had to seek more than $1 million in bonds for repairs to the bridge.

== See also ==
- List of crossings of the Missouri River
