= Nebraska Cornhuskers women's volleyball honors and awards =

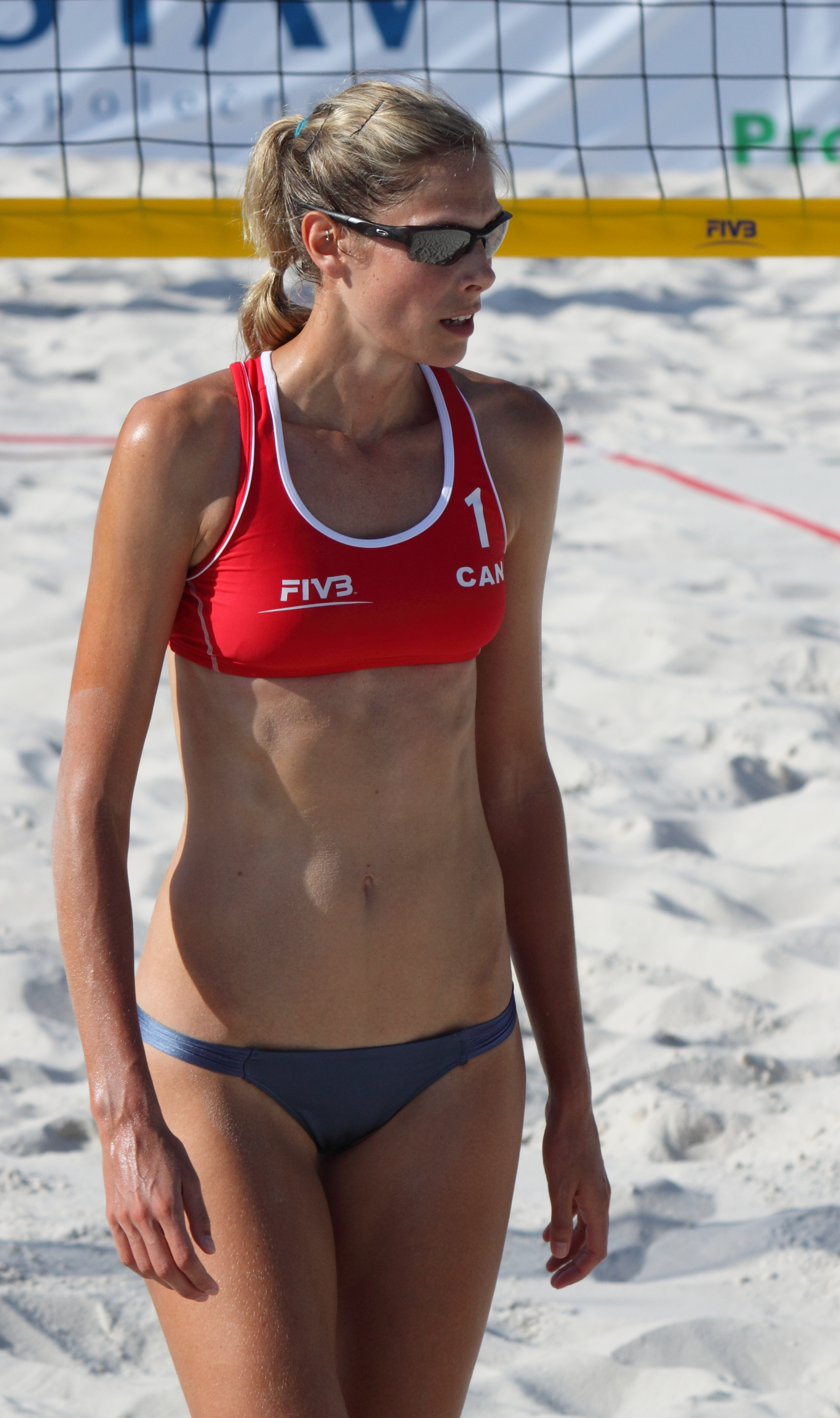
Sarah Pavan was the fourth player in NCAA Division I history to be named a first-team AVCA All-American in each of her four collegiate seasons

This is a list of Nebraska Cornhuskers women's volleyball honors and awards. The program, established in 1975, is among the most decorated in collegiate volleyball.

Four Nebraska players have been named AVCA National Player of the Year and the team has produced a nation-leading 107 AVCA All-America selections. Sarah Pavan and Lexi Rodriguez won national awards as the country's best female athlete across all sports.

== National awards ==
=== Player of the year ===
Beginning in 2025, the AVCA added position-specific, National Player of the Year Awards, for the following categories: Setter, Libero, Middle Blocker, Opposite Hitter, and Outside Hitter. The AVCA continues to award an overall National Player of the Year.

- AVCA National Player of the Year: Allison Weston (1995), Greichaly Cepero (2000), Christina Houghtelling (2005), Sarah Pavan (2006)
- AVCA National Setter of the Year: Bergen Reilly (2025)
- AVCA National Middle of the Year: Andi Jackson (2025)
- Honda Volleyball Award: Karen Dahlgren (1986), Allison Weston (1995), Greichaly Cepero (2000), Sarah Pavan (2006)
- Morgan Award: Allison Weston (1996)

=== Freshman of the year ===
- AVCA: Sarah Pavan (2004), Lexi Rodriguez (2021)
- Volleyball Magazine: Madi Kubik (2019)

=== Coach of the year ===
- AVCA: Terry Pettit (1986, 1994), John Cook (2000, 2005, 2023)
- Volleyball Magazine: John Cook (2008, 2018)

=== Other national awards ===
- NCAA Division I tournament most outstanding player: Greichaly Cepero (2000), Sarah Pavan (2006), Mikaela Foecke (2015, 2017), Kelly Hunter (2017)
- Sullivan Award: (Note: The James E. Sullivan Award was created in 1930 by the Amateur Athletic Union to honor "the outstanding athlete at the Olympic, collegiate, or similar elite level in the United States.") Lexi Rodriguez (2024)
- Broderick Cup: (Note: The Broderick Cup was created in 1976 to honor a female student-athlete who demonstrates "not only athletic achievement but also the ideals of team contribution, scholastic endeavor, school and community involvement.) Sarah Pavan (2006–07)
- Today's Top VI/VIII Award: Virginia Stahr (1990), Janet Kruse (1992), Nancy Metcalf (2002), Sarah Pavan (2008)
- NCAA Woman of the Year: (Note: The NCAA Woman of the Year Award was established in 1991 and is presented annually to a graduating female student-athlete for "outstanding academic achievements, athletic excellence, community service and leadership.") Billie Winsett (1996)

== Conference awards ==
=== Athlete of the year ===
Five Nebraska players have been named conference female athlete of the year, across all sports.

- Big Eight: Annie Adamczak (1986–87), Virginia Stahr (1989–90)
- Big 12: Greichaly Cepero (2000–01), Sarah Pavan (2006–07, 2007–08)

=== Player of the year ===
- Big Eight: Lori Endicott (1987, 1988), Virginia Stahr (1989), Val Novak (1990), Stephanie Thater (1991, 1992), Nikki Stricker (1993), Allison Weston (1994, 1995)
- Big 12: Lisa Reitsma (1996), Fiona Nepo (1998), Nancy Metcalf (1999, 2001), Greichaly Cepero (2000, 2002), Amber Holmquist (2002), Laura Pilakowski (2002), Sarah Pavan (2005, 2006, 2007), Jordan Larson (2008)
- Big Ten: Kelsey Robinson (2013), Bergen Reilly (2025)

=== Freshman of the year ===
- Big 12: Angie Oxley (1997), Greichaly Cepero (1999), Sarah Pavan (2004), Jordan Larson (2005), Hannah Werth (2009)
- Big Ten: Madi Kubik (2019), Harper Murray (2023)

=== Newcomer of the year ===
- Big Eight: Allison Weston (1992), Jen McFadden (1993), Stacie Maser (1995)
- Big 12: Megan Korver (1996), Katie Jahnke (1997), Rachel Holloway (2006), Sydney Anderson (2008), Lauren Cook (2010)

=== Defensive player of the year ===
The Defensive POY award was renamed to "Libero of the Year" by the Big Ten in 2024. However, the award still retains the same functionality as the original "Defensive Player of the Year" award.

- Big Eight: (Note: The Big Eight presented the "backcourt specialist" of the year.) Christy Johnson (1992), Stephanie Clerc (1993), Maria Hedbeck (1995)
- Big 12: Jennifer Saleaumua (2004, 2005), Jordan Larson (2006, 2008), Christina Houghtelling (2007), Hannah Werth (2010)
- Big Ten: Justine Wong-Orantes (2015, 2016), Lexi Rodriguez (2021, 2023, 2024), Olivia Mauch (2026)

=== Setter of the year ===
- Big Ten: Bergen Reilly (2023, 2024, 2025, 2026)

=== Coach of the year ===
- Big Eight: Terry Pettit (1985, 1986, 1987, 1989, 1990, 1994, 1995)
- Big 12: Terry Pettit (1996, 1998), John Cook (2001, 2005, 2008, 2010)
- Big Ten: John Cook (2016, 2017, 2023), Dani Busboom Kelly (2025, 2026)

== All-Americans ==
Nebraska has had 55 players account for an NCAA-leading 111 AVCA All-America selections, including fifty-six first-team, forty-two second-team, and thirteen third-team All-America awards. Terri Kanouse, the first Cornhusker to be named a first-team All-American, was selected by the AIAW.

=== First-team ===
- Terri Kanouse – 1980 (AIAW)
- Cathy Noth – 1983
- Annie Adamczak – 1985
- Karen Dahlgren – 1986
- Lori Endicott – 1988
- Virginia Stahr – 1988
- Val Novak – 1989, 1990
- Janet Kruse – 1989, 1990
- Stephanie Thater – 1991, 1992
- Allison Weston – 1993, 1994, 1995
- Christy Johnson – 1994, 1995
- Lisa Reitsma – 1995, 1996
- Fiona Nepo – 1996, 1998
- Nancy Metcalf – 1998, 1999, 2001
- Laura Pilakowski – 2000
- Greichaly Cepero – 2000, 2002
- Amber Holmquist – 2001, 2002
- Melissa Elmer – 2004, 2005
- Sarah Pavan – 2004, 2005, 2006, 2007
- Christina Houghtelling – 2005
- Jordan Larson – 2006, 2008
- Brooke Delano – 2010
- Gina Mancuso – 2011
- Lauren Cook – 2012
- Kelsey Robinson – 2013
- Kadie Rolfzen – 2015, 2016
- Justine Wong-Orantes – 2016
- Kelly Hunter – 2017
- Mikaela Foecke – 2018
- Lauren Stivrins – 2018, 2020
- Lexi Rodriguez – 2021, 2023, 2024
- Merritt Beason – 2023
- Andi Jackson – 2024, 2025
- Harper Murray - 2025
- Bergen Reilly - 2025

=== Second-team ===
- Cathy Noth – 1984
- Karen Dahlgren – 1985
- Enid Schonewise – 1986
- Tisha Delaney – 1986
- Lori Endicott – 1987
- Virginia Stahr – 1989
- Stephanie Thater – 1990
- Chris Hall – 1991
- Janet Kruse – 1991
- Kelly Aspegren – 1994
- Fiona Nepo – 1997
- Lisa Reitsma – 1997
- Megan Korver – 1998
- Amber Holmquist – 2000
- Jenny Kropp – 2001
- Greichaly Cepero – 2001
- Laura Pilakowski - 2002
- Melissa Elmer – 2003
- Jennifer Saleaumua – 2004
- Tracy Stalls – 2006, 2007
- Christina Houghtelling – 2007
- Rachel Holloway – 2007
- Sydney Anderson – 2008
- Tara Mueller – 2008
- Brooke Delano – 2009
- Lindsey Licht – 2010
- Hannah Werth – 2010, 2012
- Gina Mancuso – 2012
- Amber Rolfzen – 2015
- Kelly Hunter – 2016
- Annika Albrecht – 2017
- Mikaela Foecke – 2017
- Lauren Stivrins – 2019
- Nicklin Hames – 2020
- Kayla Caffey – 2021
- Lexi Rodriguez – 2022
- Bergen Reilly – 2023, 2024
- Harper Murray – 2024
- Rebekah Allick - 2025

=== Third-team ===
- Jennifer Saleaumua – 2005
- Rachel Holloway – 2006
- Jordan Larson – 2007
- Sydney Anderson – 2009
- Kadie Rolfzen – 2013, 2014
- Justine Wong-Orantes – 2015
- Amber Rolfzen – 2016
- Kenzie Maloney – 2018
- Lexi Sun – 2019, 2020
- Madi Kubik – 2021
- Harper Murray – 2023

== Retired jerseys ==
No.	Player	Position	Tenure	Retired (Note: The year the player's jersey was retired by the university.)
2	Lori Endicott	S	1985–1988	2003
2	Stephanie Thater	MB	1989–1992	2010
7	Nancy Metcalf	OPP	1997–2001	2011
9	Sarah Pavan	OPP	2004–2007	2018
10	Jordan Larson	OH	2005–2008	2017
11	Cathy Noth	S	1981–1984	2003
13	Karen Dahlgren	MB	1983–1986	2003
17	Janet Kruse	OH	1988–1991	2004
18	Allison Weston	MB	1992–1995	2003
