= Linoma =

Linoma may refer to

- Dictyosperma - A monotypic genus of flowering plant in the palm family
- Linoma Lighthouse - A tourist attraction near Ashland, NE on the Platte River
- Linoma Software - A Secure Managed File Transfer software company located in Ashland, NE
