= Chalco, Nebraska =

- CDP
- Location of Chalco, Nebraska
- Coordinates: 41°11′1″N 96°8′2″W
- Country: United States
- State: Nebraska
- County: Sarpy

Area
  - Total: 2.64 sq mi (6.84 km^{2})
  - Land: 2.64 sq mi (6.84 km^{2})
  - Water: 0 sq mi (0.00 km^{2})
- Elevation: 1,076 ft (328 m)

Population (2020)
  - Total: 11,064
  - Density: 4,189.4/sq mi (1,617.54/km^{2})
- Time zone: UTC-6 (Central (CST))
  - Summer (DST): UTC-5 (CDT)
- ZIP code: 68138
- Area codes: 402,531
- FIPS code: 31-08640
- GNIS feature ID: 2393371

Chalco is a census-designated place (CDP) in northern Sarpy County, Nebraska, United States, and an adjacent suburb of Omaha, with La Vista located to the southeast. The population was 11,064 at the 2020 census.

== History ==
A post office was established at Chalco in 1888, and remained in operation until it was discontinued in 1950. The community was likely named after Chalco, in Mexico.

== Geography ==
According to the United States Census Bureau, the CDP has a total area of 2.9 square miles (7.5 km^{2}), all land.

== Demographics ==
Historical population
Census	Pop.	Note	%±
2020	11,064		—
U.S. Decennial Census

=== 2020 census ===
As of the 2020 census, Chalco had a population of 11,064. The median age was 35.1 years. 24.8% of residents were under the age of 18 and 9.7% of residents were 65 years of age or older. For every 100 females there were 103.5 males, and for every 100 females age 18 and over there were 101.1 males age 18 and over.

100.0% of residents lived in urban areas, while 0.0% lived in rural areas.

There were 4,401 households in Chalco, of which 33.8% had children under the age of 18 living in them. Of all households, 50.4% were married-couple households, 19.3% were households with a male householder and no spouse or partner present, and 21.8% were households with a female householder and no spouse or partner present. About 26.6% of all households were made up of individuals and 6.5% had someone living alone who was 65 years of age or older.

There were 4,473 housing units, of which 1.6% were vacant. The homeowner vacancy rate was 0.2% and the rental vacancy rate was 3.6%.

Racial composition as of the 2020 census
Race	Number	Percent
White	9,339	84.4%
Black or African American	293	2.6%
American Indian and Alaska Native	39	0.4%
Asian	212	1.9%
Native Hawaiian and Other Pacific Islander	31	0.3%
Some other race	327	3.0%
Two or more races	823	7.4%
Hispanic or Latino (of any race)	841	7.6%

=== 2000 census ===
As of the 2000 census, there were 10,736 people, 3,719 households, and 2,915 families residing in the CDP. The population density was 3,703.3 inhabitants per square mile (1,429.9/km^{2}). There were 3,758 housing units at an average density of 1,296.3 per square mile (500.5/km^{2}). The racial makeup of the CDP was 95.24% White, 0.82% Black or African American, 0.30% Native American, 1.08% Asian, 0.02% Pacific Islander, 0.90% from other races, and 1.64% from two or more races. Hispanic or Latino of any race were 2.81% of the population.

There were 3,719 households, out of which 51.1% had children under the age of 18 living with them, 67.0% were married couples living together, 8.6% had a female householder with no husband present, and 21.6% were non-families. 16.0% of all households were made up of individuals, and 0.8% had someone living alone who was 65 years of age or older. The average household size was 2.89 and the average family size was 3.28.

In the CDP, the population was spread out, with 33.2% under the age of 18, 7.6% from 18 to 24, 43.6% from 25 to 44, 13.9% from 45 to 64, and 1.6% who were 65 years of age or older. The median age was 29 years. For every 100 females, there were 100.7 males. For every 100 females age 18 and over, there were 98.1 males.

The median income for a household in the CDP was $60,357, and the median income for a family was $62,217. Males had a median income of $40,403 versus $28,066 for females. The per capita income for the CDP was $21,370. About 2.0% of families and 2.9% of the population were below the poverty line, including 4.1% of those under age 18 and none of those age 65 or over.

== Education ==
Most of Chalco is zoned to Millard Public Schools while a portion is zoned to Papillion-La Vista Community Schools.
