= Meadow, Nebraska =

Unincorporated community in Sarpy County, Nebraska, United States

Meadow
- Unincorporated community
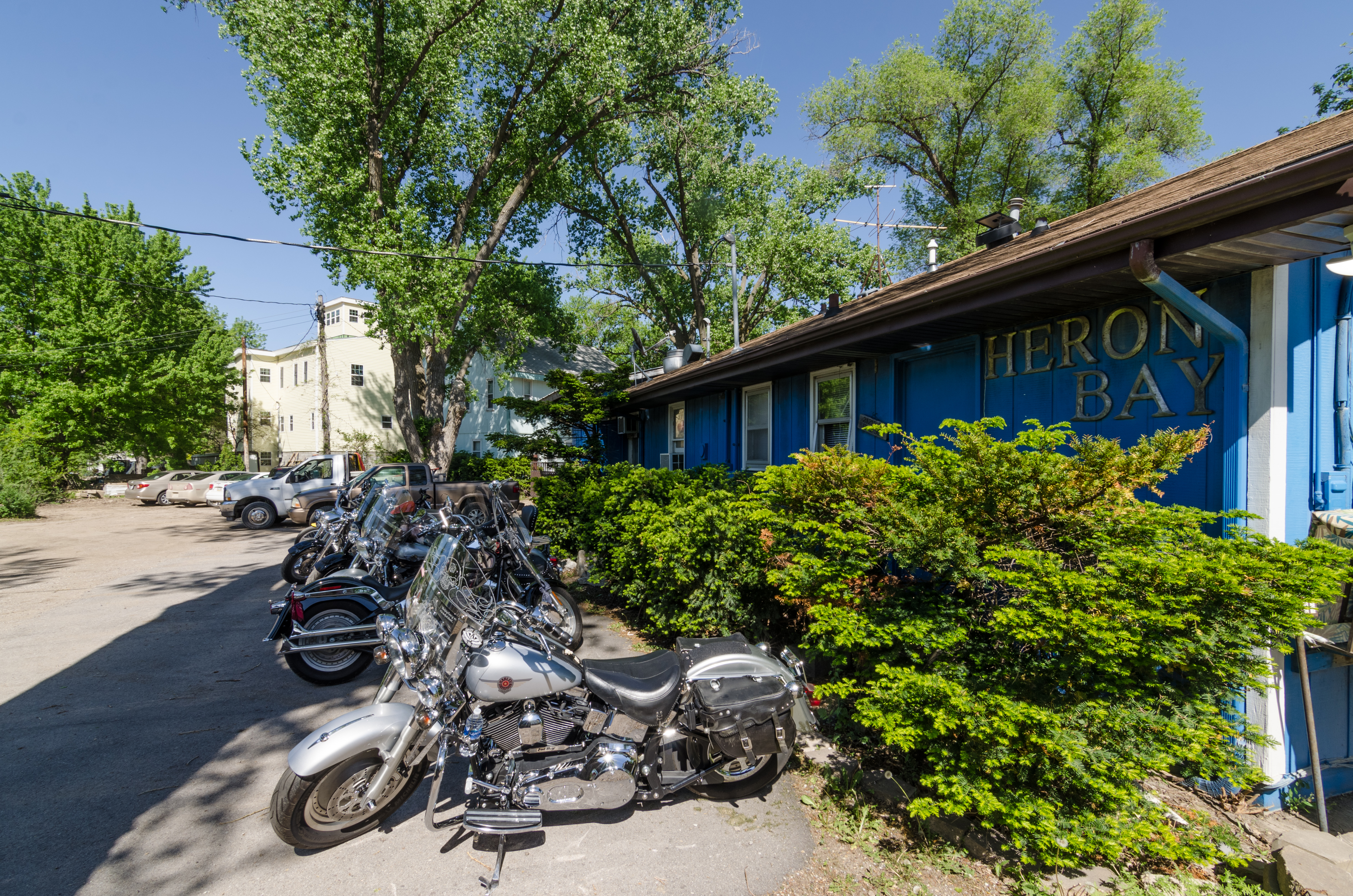
- Heron Bay on the Platte River, May 2017

- Location within the state of Nebraska Location within the United States
- Country: United States
- State: Nebraska
- County: Sarpy
- Elevation: 1,017 ft (310 m)
- Time zone: UTC-6 (Central (CST))
  - Summer (DST): UTC-5 (CDT)
- ZIP codes: 68059
- GNIS feature ID: 831172

Meadow is an unincorporated community in Sarpy County, Nebraska, United States.

== History ==
Meadow was established on the railroad on the site of what was a meadow, hence the name. A post office in Meadow operated from 1894 until 1953.
