= Linoma Beach, Nebraska =

Census-designated place in Sarpy County, Nebraska, United States

- Census-designated place
- Location within Nebraska Location within the United States
- Coordinates: 41°3′35″N 96°18′57″W
- Country: United States
- State: Nebraska
- County: Sarpy

Area
  - Total: 0.71 sq mi (1.85 km^{2})
  - Land: 0.53 sq mi (1.36 km^{2})
  - Water: 0.19 sq mi (0.49 km^{2})
- Elevation: 1,056 ft (322 m)

Population (2020)
  - Total: 43
  - Density: 82/sq mi (31.6/km^{2})
- Time zone: UTC-6 (Central (CST))
  - Summer (DST): UTC-5 (CDT)
- ZIP Code: 68028 (Gretna)
- Area codes: 402/531
- FIPS code: 31-28165
- GNIS feature ID: 2806918

Linoma Beach is a census-designated place (CDP) in Sarpy County, Nebraska, United States, comprising the Linoma Beach historic district and adjacent land to the east. The community is in the southwest part of the county, on the east bank of the Platte River. It is bordered to the north, across U.S. Route 6 (US 6), by the CDP of Beacon View. US 6 leads northeast 7 miles (11 km) to Gretna and southwest 3.5 miles (5.6 km) to Nebraska. Omaha is 28 miles (45 km) to the northeast.

As of the 2020 census, Linoma Beach had a population of 43.

The community was first listed as a CDP prior to the 2020 census.

== Demographics ==
Historical population
Census	Pop.	Note	%±
2020	43		—
U.S. Decennial Census

== See also ==
- List of census-designated places in Nebraska
