= Avery, Nebraska =

Unincorporated community in Sarpy County, Nebraska, United States

- Unincorporated community
- Location within Nebraska Location within the United States
- Coordinates: 41°09′49″N 95°55′21″W
- Country: United States
- State: Nebraska
- County: Sarpy

Avery is an Unincorporated community in Sarpy County, Nebraska, United States.

== History ==
Avery was laid out on the railroad. A post office was established in Avery in 1891, and remained in operation until it was discontinued in 1908.
