= Scarlett Miller =

American engineer

Scarlett Rae Miller (also published as Scarlett R. Herring) is an American professor of engineering whose research topics have included creativity and psychological safety in engineering design, design-focused engineering education, human–computer interaction in the design process, and simulation-based medical training. She is the Paul Morrow Professor of Engineering Design and Manufacturing at Pennsylvania State University.

== Education and career ==
After graduating in 2002 from Papillion-La Vista Senior High School near Omaha, Nebraska, Miller majored in Industrial & Management Systems Engineering at the University of Nebraska–Lincoln, where she graduated in 2006. After a 2007 master's degree in industrial engineering, with a minor in psychology, she continued her education at the University of Illinois Urbana-Champaign. There, she completed a Ph.D. in industrial engineering in 2011. Her doctoral dissertation, Supporting example-based ideation and assessment practices in engineering design, was supervised by Ali E. Abbas.

She has been on the Pennsylvania State University faculty since 2011, initially as an assistant professor and James F. Will Career Development Professor in the School of Engineering Design. She holds affiliations as a professor in the Marcus Department of Industrial and Manufacturing Engineering the Department of Mechanical Engineering, and the School of Engineering Design and Innovation in the College of Engineering, the College of Information Sciences and Technology, and the Department of Surgery in the College of Medicine. She is also a special advisor to the university's senior vice president for research, director of the Cocoziello Institute for Real Estate Innovation, and director of the Brite Laboratory. Formerly director of the Center for Research in Design and Innovation, she was named director of the Cocoziello Institute in 2024.

She is the founder of a starup for medical simulation education, Medulate.

== Recognition ==
In 2024, the American Society of Mechanical Engineers (ASME) named Miller as an ASME Fellow.
