= Linoma Beach =

- U.S. National Register of Historic Places
- U.S. Historic district
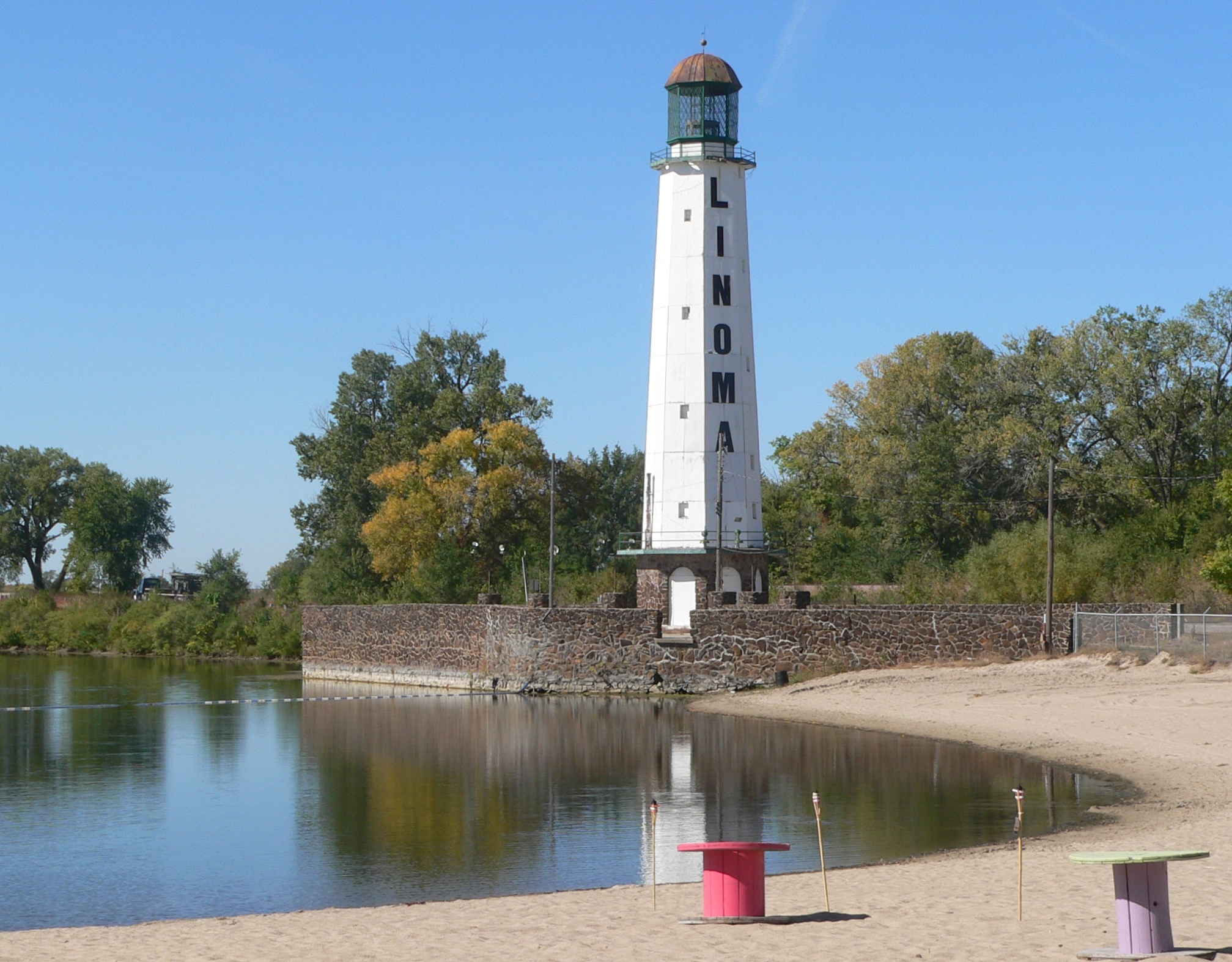
- Linoma Beach and lighthouse

- Location within Nebraska Location within the United States
- Nearest city: Ashland, Nebraska
- Coordinates: 41°3′44″N 96°19′8″W
- Area: 59 acres (24 ha)
- Built: 1924
- NRHP reference No.: 03000107
- Added to NRHP: March 11, 2003

Linoma Beach, now doing business under the name Linoma Lighthouse, is a privately owned recreation area developed around an artificial lake in Sarpy County in the eastern part of the state of Nebraska, in the Midwestern United States. The site was opened in 1924; in 1939, a 100-foot (30 m) lighthouse was added to it. The lighthouse is a conspicuous landmark on U.S. Highway 6 between Omaha and Lincoln, Nebraska.

Linoma Beach is listed in the National Register of Historic Places, as a well-preserved example of a once-common but now vanishing type of roadside architecture. The community is listed by the U.S. Census Bureau, for statistical purposes, as the Linoma Beach census-designated place.

== History ==
=== Development ===
In 1907, the Lyman-Richey Sand Company began extracting sand and gravel from a site on the north bank of the Platte River about four miles (6 km) northeast of Ashland, Nebraska. Quarrying continued until 1915, resulting in a collection of small lakes supplied by underground springs.

In about 1920, Harry E. Schellberg of Lyman-Richey and Lawrence G. Simpson of the Chicago Lumber Company of Omaha established the Inland Development Syndicate, which by 1924 bought portions of Lyman-Richey's holdings near Ashland. In 1924, the syndicate changed its name to the Linoma Realty Company; in that year, it opened the Linoma Beach resort at the old quarry site. The new resort was situated about halfway between and about 30 miles (50 km) from Lincoln and Omaha, Nebraska's two largest cities; its name is a portmanteau, taken from the first three letters of each of the two names.

The company invested about $10,000 to prepare the site. The sandpit lakes were 50 to 60 feet (15 to 18 m) deep, and unsafe for swimming; to remedy this, 30,000 cubic feet (850 m^{3}) of sand was pumped into them. Additional sand was moved to create a beach over 100 feet (30 m) wide and extending 600 feet (180 m) along the shore. A "model, sanitary bathhouse" was constructed, furnished with "[p]late glass mirrors, electric lights, and many conveniences". Acres of picnic grounds were developed; and a farmhouse on the site was converted into a restaurant, surrounded by a veranda suitable for dancing. The restaurant's first manager was Alfred Jones, a well-known African-American cook from Omaha; at the time, it was unusual for a non-white to hold such a prominent position.

The new resort was accessible by road and by rail. To persuade the Chicago, Burlington and Quincy Railroad to stop at Linoma, the developers installed a platform and lighting. Three trains were available on both Saturdays and Sundays; the round-trip ticket from Omaha cost $1.11, and that from Lincoln $1.10.

Motorists could also reach Linoma. In 1911, the Omaha-Denver Transcontinental Route Association had been established in Nebraska as part of the Good Roads Movement. The Association had laid out the route of the Omaha-Lincoln-Denver (O‑L‑D) Highway and begun work on improving it. In 1920, the highway was incorporated into the Detroit-Lincoln-Denver (D‑L‑D) Highway. The Federal Highway Act of 1921 had directed federal funds for highway improvement; this allowed Nebraska to begin gravelling the D‑L‑D Highway. By 1927, an advertisement for Linoma Beach pointed out that the route was entirely gravelled, and could be driven in all weathers.

=== Opening ===
Linoma Beach held its grand opening on July 4, 1924. The company's 1924 financial statement suggests that there were several thousand visitors in that first year (for example, receipts for beach admission totaled $1,236, at 25 cents a person). The resort was popular at night as well as by day, and the nightly dances contributed significantly to its popularity.

Responding to this, Simpson, who bought out Schellberg in 1925, installed a dance pavilion and began charging five cents for dancing; local bands played on Wednesday, Saturday, and Sunday nights. These were generally but not universally popular: the ministers of Ashland complained of decreased church attendance on Sunday nights. Unsatisfied with the results of a meeting with the Linoma manager, a delegation of three ministers called on the state attorney general, and were gratified to learn that Nebraska had a strict law forbidding Sunday night dancing. However, Simpson found a way to maintain the revenue stream. A perusal of the law revealed that it was illegal to conduct a public dance on Sunday, but that private dance clubs could rent the pavilion and dance the night away undisturbed by the law. The "Ben Ahamo" dance club was launched, and memberships offered as part of Linoma's entertainment package.

The resort, including the evening dances, remained popular. For the 1927 season, the picnic grounds were expanded with the addition of 75 new tables and the planting of 300 maple trees. For weed control, the manager brought in a herd of one hundred sheep. For the 1928 season, the entire recreation area was fenced; this allowed the manager to charge an admission fee of ten cents on Sundays, although admission to the grounds remained free for the rest of the week.

The onset of the Great Depression did not appear to diminish Linoma's popularity; 1,700 people were admitted on July 4, 1930. However, dancing was becoming less of an attraction. In 1930, dances were only held on one night a week. In 1931, the railroad line and the highway, now designated U.S. Highway 38, were re-aligned following a series of floods. The re-alignment necessitated the demolition of the dance pavilion, and it was not rebuilt.

=== The automobile age ===
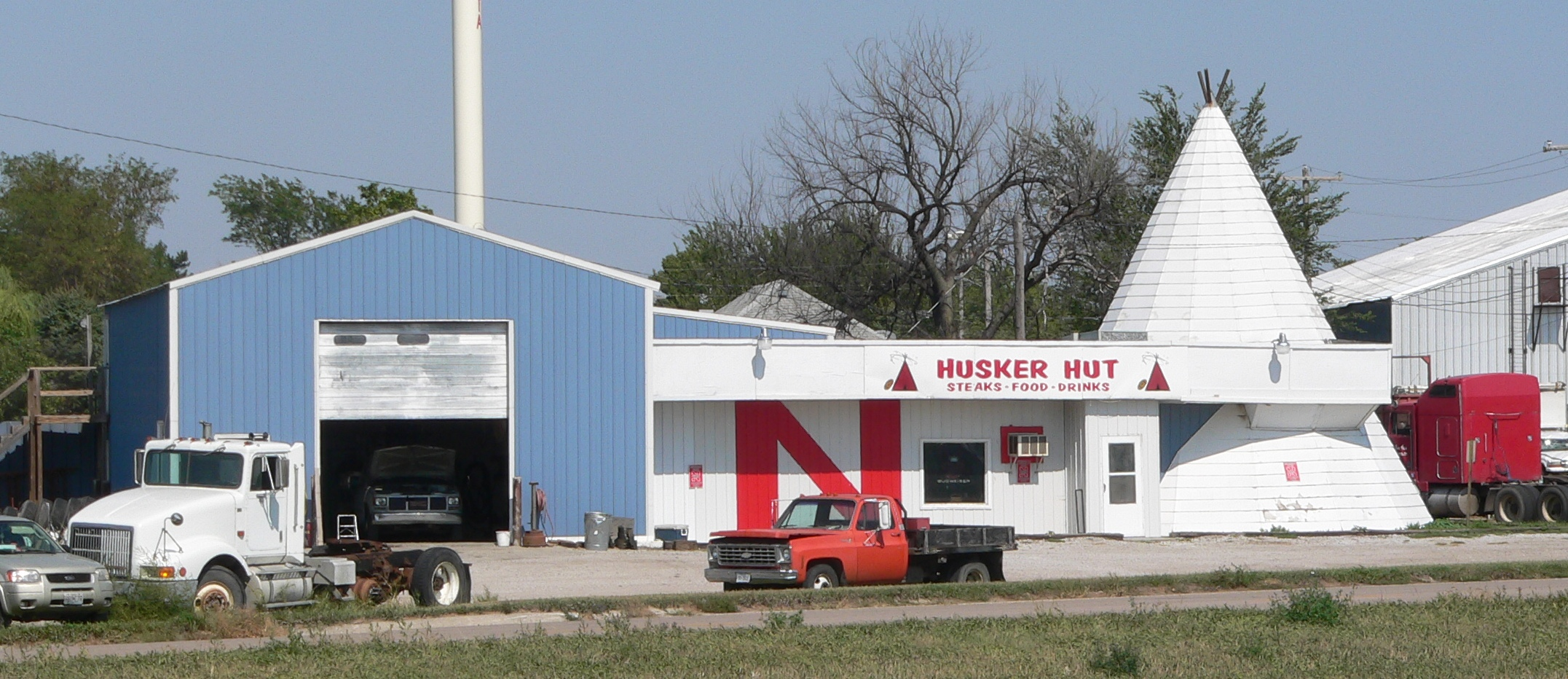
Husker Hut bar in Atlanta, Nebraska; built ca. 1938 as the Wigwam Souvenir Stand

As automobile ownership increased and roads were improved, more and more patrons began arriving at Linoma by road. Simpson responded to this in 1933 by paving a parking lot and surrounding it with an octagonal stone wall. To accommodate the increased number of visitors, 100 new tables were installed, increasing the seating capacity to 5,000.

To entice motor tourists, roadside businesses across Nebraska installed whimsical and eye-catching structures. Wigwam-themed buildings were constructed in several places in Nebraska, including a motel court in Hastings and a gift shop in Atlanta. The Showboat complex near Hastings was built in the likeness of a Mississippi River side-wheeler, complete with a paddle wheel dipping into the Nebraska sod.

As a waterside attraction, Linoma opted for a maritime theme. In 1939, a 100-foot (30 m) lighthouse was constructed beside the highway. The base of the lighthouse was a glass-and-masonry filling station. A central spiral staircase led to observation decks on the second and tenth stories; the tenth-floor deck ran around the lighthouse's beacon. The rooms above the first story have plumbing, stoves, and windows; although there is no documentation to support the conjecture, it is likely that they were intended for overnight guests.

Gasoline rationing during World War II put an end to automobile tourism for the duration of the war. When the war ended, the lighthouse's beacon flashed the Morse code "V" for "victory". However, Linoma's fortunes declined. The lighthouse fell into disrepair, and the restaurant closed. A drowning in 2005 and another in 2009 led to temporary closures and raised liability concerns for the owners. In 2009, the resort's neighbors complained to the Sarpy County Planning Commission that the site was becoming an eyesore and that loose furniture and other items were being left out by departing summer campers, in contravention of floodplain restrictions.

== Preservation and restoration ==
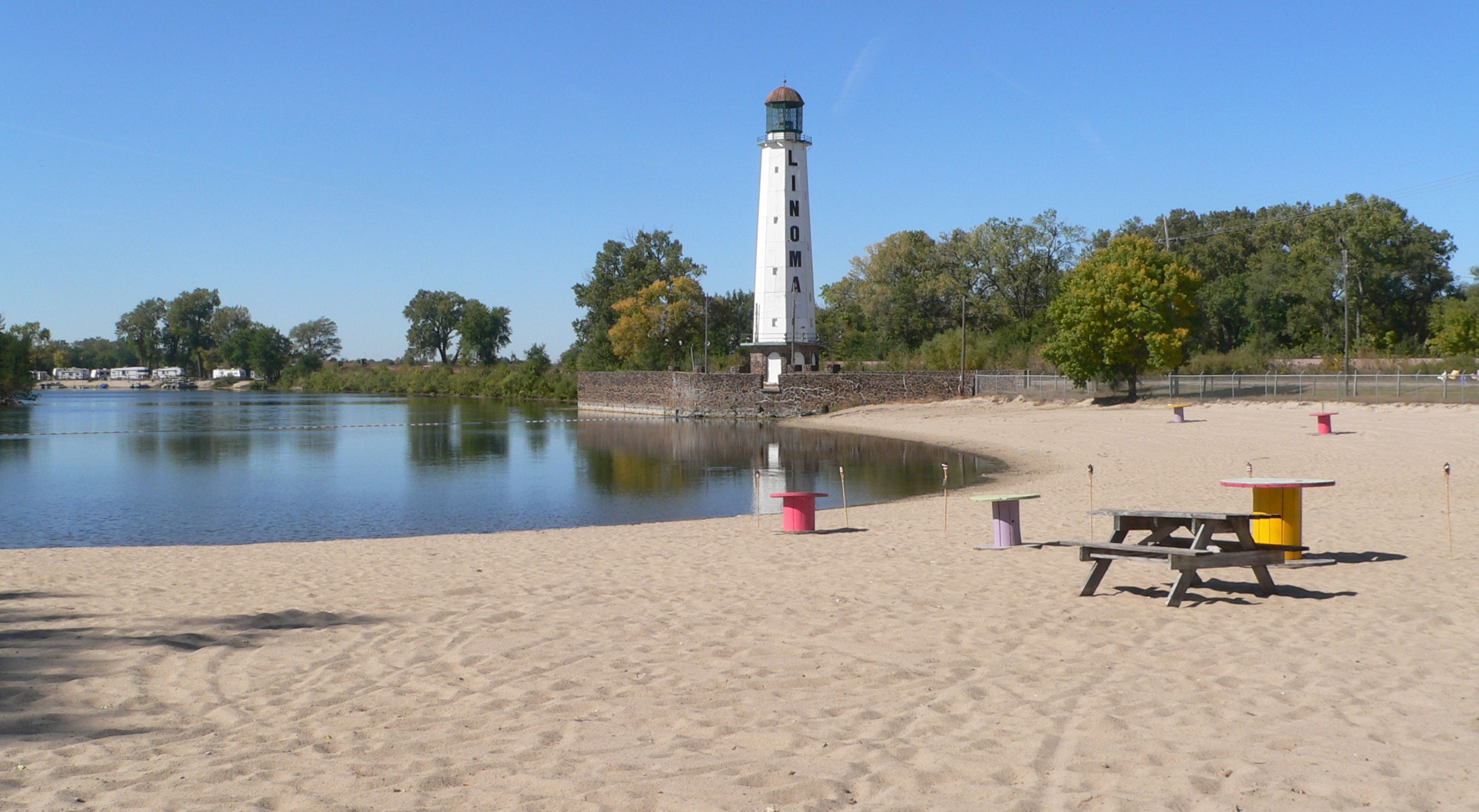
Linoma Beach in 2011

In 2003, Linoma Beach was listed in the National Register of Historic Places. The lighthouse was judged especially significant, as representative of a vanishing type of early twentieth century roadside architecture.

In 2010, a group of five local investors operating as Linoma and Lighthouse LLC bought the property at a foreclosure auction for $905,000, an amount well below its tax-assessed value. The group proposed to maintain the campground, seek an operator to lease the restaurant, and hold special events at the resort. They also expressed the intention to transfer ownership of the lighthouse to a foundation established to restore, preserve, and protect it.

In 2011, Linoma Beach was open seven days a week during the season. The campground remained open; the swimming beach was re-opened, without the large iceberg-shaped inflatable floats that had been named as a liability concern in the 2005 drowning; and a beach-themed bar and grill, the Linoma Beach Bar, had been established under the management of a classically trained and Caribbean-experienced chef. At that time, no one had been found to operate the restaurant. Although inclement weather caused the cancellation of the resort's first special event of the season, attendance was generally good: the 2011 Missouri River floods had benefitted Linoma by closing a number of riverfront resorts and forcing their clientele to seek new venues of pleasure.
