= Cade Johnson =

American football player (born 1998)

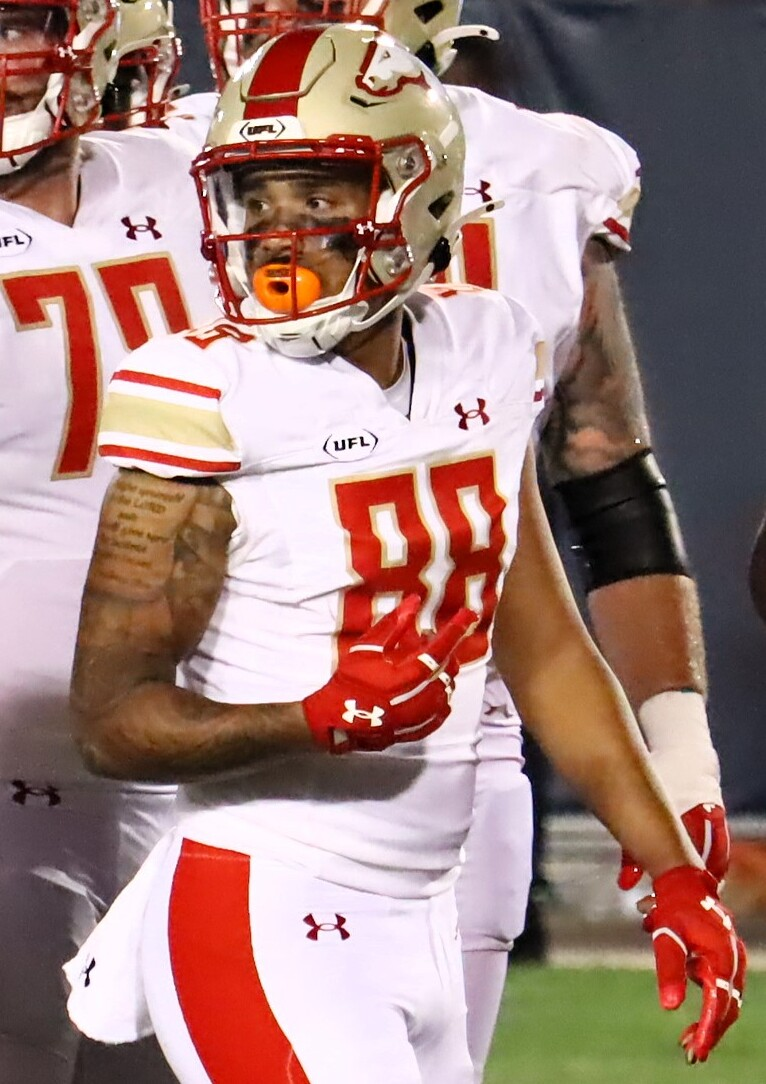
- Johnson with the Birmingham Stallions in 2025

Profile
- Position: Wide receiver

Personal information
- Born: April 10, 1998 (age 28); Papillion, Nebraska, U.S.
- Listed height: 5 ft 10 in (1.78 m)
- Listed weight: 184 lb (83 kg)

Career information
- High school: Bellevue West (Bellevue, Nebraska)
- College: South Dakota State
- NFL draft: 2021: undrafted

Career history
- Seattle Seahawks (2021–2023); Birmingham Stallions (2025)

Awards and highlights
- First-team FCS All-American (2019); 2× First-team All-MVFC (2018, 2019)

Career NFL statistics
- Receptions: 2
- Receiving yards: 21
- Stats at Pro Football Reference

Cade Johnson (born April 10, 1998) is an American professional football wide receiver. He played college football at South Dakota State.

== Early life ==
Johnson grew up in Papillion, Nebraska and attended Bellevue West High School. As a senior, he caught 43 passes for 1,061 yards and 16 touchdowns and was named first-team All-State.

== College career ==
Johnson redshirted his true freshman season after joining the team as a walk-on. As a redshirt freshman he caught 23 passes for 318 yards and three touchdowns and returned 30 kickoffs for a school-record 839 yards with two touchdowns and was named the Missouri Valley Football Conference (MVFC) All-Newcomer team. He led the Jackrabbits with 67 receptions for 1,332 yards and a single-season school-record 17 touchdown catches in his redshirt sophomore season and was named first-team All-MVFC. As a redshirt junior, Johnson was named a first-team All-American by The Associated Press and Walter Camp as well as first-team All-MVFC after finishing the season with 72 catches for 1,222 yards and eight touchdowns. After South Dakota State's 2020 season was canceled due to the COVID-19 pandemic, Johnson initially entered the transfer portal with the intention of transferring to an FBS Power Five program for his final season before ultimately deciding to declare for the 2021 NFL Draft.

== Professional career ==
Pre-draft measurables
Height	Weight	Arm length	Hand span	40-yard dash	10-yard split	20-yard split	Vertical jump	Broad jump	Bench press
5 ft 10 5/8 in (1.79 m)	184 lb (83 kg)	29 1/4 in (0.74 m)	9 1/2 in (0.24 m)	4.51 s	1.59 s	2.69 s	35.0 in (0.89 m)	9 ft 6 in (2.90 m)	11 reps
All values from Pro Day

=== Seattle Seahawks ===
Johnson signed with the Seattle Seahawks as an undrafted free agent on May 14, 2021. He was waived on August 31, 2021, and re-signed to the practice squad the next day. He was released on November 24, but re-signed a week later. He signed a reserve/future contract with the Seahawks on January 10, 2022.

On August 30, 2022, Johnson was waived by the Seahawks and signed to the practice squad the next day. In Week 18 against the Los Angeles Rams, Johnson caught his first two career passes for 21 yards in the 19–16 victory. He signed a reserve/future contract on January 17, 2023.

On August 29, 2023, Johnson was waived by the Seahawks and re-signed to the practice squad. He was not signed to a reserve/future contract after the season and thus became a free agent upon the expiration of his practice squad contract.

=== Birmingham Stallions ===
On December 19, 2024, Johnson signed with the Birmingham Stallions of the United Football League (UFL).

== Personal life ==
Johnson's father, Clester Johnson, played college football at Nebraska and was a member of the team's 1994 and 1995 National Championship teams. His older brother, C.J., played wide receiver at the University of Wyoming. His little brother, Keagan, is a wide receiver for Kansas State and was previously at the University of Iowa.
