= Beacon View, Nebraska =

Census-designated place in Sarpy County, Nebraska, United States

- Census-designated place
- Location within Nebraska Location within the United States
- Coordinates: 41°4′9″N 96°19′33″W
- Country: United States
- State: Nebraska
- County: Sarpy

Area
  - Total: 0.43 sq mi (1.12 km^{2})
  - Land: 0.27 sq mi (0.70 km^{2})
  - Water: 0.16 sq mi (0.41 km^{2})
- Elevation: 1,066 ft (325 m)

Population (2020)
  - Total: 55
  - Density: 202.2/sq mi (78.08/km^{2})
- Time zone: UTC-6 (Central (CST))
  - Summer (DST): UTC-5 (CDT)
- ZIP Code: 68028 (Gretna)
- Area codes: 402/531
- FIPS code: 31-03377
- GNIS feature ID: 2806917

Beacon View is a census-designated place (CDP) in Sarpy County, Nebraska, United States. It is in the southwest part of the county, on the east bank of the Platte River. It is bordered to the south, across U.S. Route 6 (US 6), by the CDP of Linoma Beach. US 6 leads northeast 7 miles (11 km) to Gretna and southwest 3.5 miles (5.6 km) to Nebraska. Omaha is 28 miles (45 km) to the northeast. As of the 2020 census, Beacon View had a population of 55.

The community was first listed as a CDP prior to the 2020 census.

== Demographics ==
Historical population
Census	Pop.	Note	%±
2020	55		—
U.S. Decennial Census

== See also ==
- List of census-designated places in Nebraska
