= Iowa Highway 370 =

Former state highway in Iowa, United States

Iowa Highway 370
- Iowa 370 highlighted in red

Route information
- Maintained by Iowa DOT
- Length: 3.265 mi (5.255 km)
- Existed: 1953–2014

Major junctions
- West end: N-370 in Bellevue, Nebr.
- East end: I-29 / US 275 south of Council Bluffs

Location
- Country: United States
- State: Iowa
- Counties: Mills

Highway system
- Iowa Primary Highway System; Interstate; US; State; Secondary; Scenic
| ← Iowa 346 | → Iowa 376 |

Iowa Highway 370 (Iowa 370) was a state highway which connected Nebraska Highway 370 (N-370) to Interstate 29 (I-29) / U.S. Highway 275 (US 275) south of Council Bluffs. Iowa 370 crossed the Bellevue Bridge over the Missouri River at Bellevue, Nebraska. The entire route was within 15 miles (24 km) of Council Bluffs and downtown Omaha, Nebraska.

== Route description ==
Iowa 370 was a short route, just over three and a quarter miles (5.2 km) in length. It began on the Bellevue Bridge where N-370 crossed the Missouri River. The highway cut through farmland shaped by the meandering river's course. Iowa 370 ended at exit 42 along I-29 / US 275.

== History ==
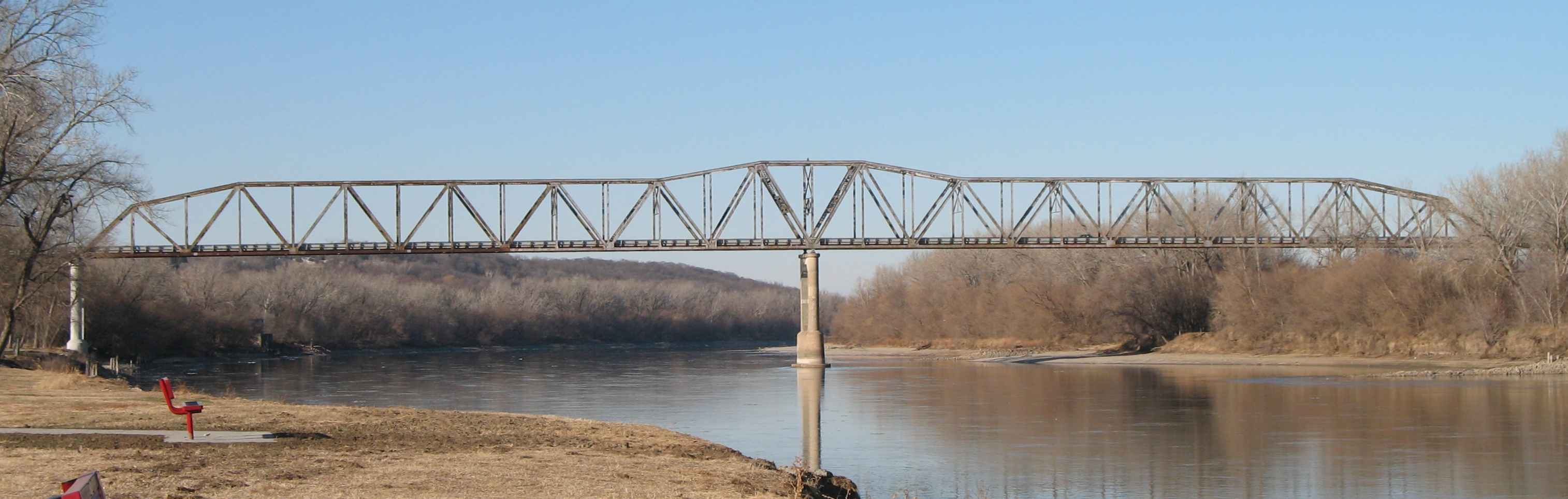
Bellevue Bridge

Designated in 1953, Iowa 370 originally extended 5.5 miles (8.9 km) from Bellevue, Nebraska, to US 275. The eastern end of the route was in Pottawattamie County. In the early 1980s, Iowa 370 was truncated at I-29. The segment in Mills County from I-29 to the Pottawattamie County line was inventoried as Iowa 935 until July 1, 2003.

Upon completion and opening of the new US 34 bridge over the Missouri River, Iowa 370 was turned over to Mills County.

== Major intersections ==
The entire route was in St. Marys Township, Mills County.

| mi | km | Destinations | Notes |
|---|---|---|---|
| 0.000 | 0.000 | N-370 west (Mission Avenue) | Continuation into Bellevue, Nebraska |
| 0.000 | 0.000 | Bellevue Bridge over the Missouri River (toll) | |
| 3.265 | 5.255 | I-29 / US 275 – Council Bluffs, Kansas City | Eastern terminus; I-29 exit 42; road continued as Bunge Avenue |
1.000 mi = 1.609 km; 1.000 km = 0.621 mi: Tolled
