= Amber Rolfzen =

American volleyball player (born 1994)

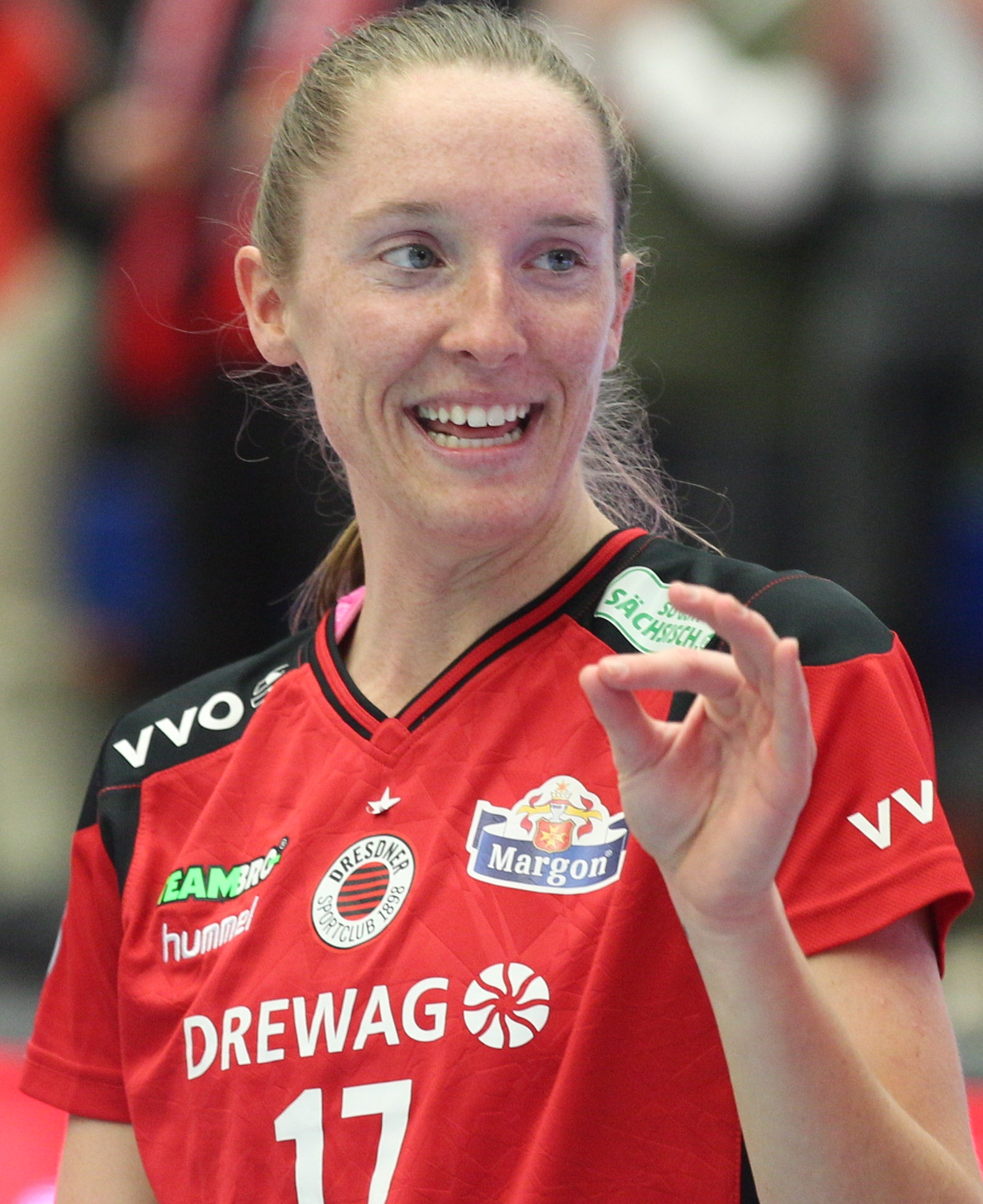

Personal information
- Born: August 25, 1994 (age 32); Papillion, Nebraska
- Education: University of Nebraska–Lincoln

Volleyball information
- Current club: Dresdner SC
- Number: 17

National team
United States

Amber Rolfzen (born August 25, 1994, in Papillion, Nebraska) is an American volleyball player who plays in the German Women's Volleyball League.

== Playing career ==
She played for Nebraska. She participated at the 2016–17 Women's CEV Cup, with Dresdner SC.

== Clubs ==
Club	Country	From	To
Dresdner SC	Germany	2016-2017	2016-2017
