= Gilmore, Nebraska =

Unincorporated community in Sarpy County, Nebraska, United States

Gilbert, Nebraska
- Unincorporated community
- Location within Nebraska Location within the United States
- Coordinates: 41°08′40″N 95°57′05″W
- Country: United States
- State: Nebraska
- County: Sarpy

Gilmore is an unincorporated community in Sarpy County, Nebraska, United States.

== History ==
A post office was established at Gilmore in 1869, and remained in operation until it was discontinued in 1908.

An early railroad town, the community was named for a railroad official.
