= Portal, Nebraska =

Community in Sarpy County, Nebraska, United States

- Unincorporated community
- Location within Nebraska Location within the United States
- Coordinates: 41°10′35″N 96°04′51″W
- Country: United States
- State: Nebraska
- County: Sarpy

Portal is an unincorporated community in Sarpy County, Nebraska, United States.

== History ==
Portal was established on the railroad. A post office opened at Portal in 1887, and remained in operation until 1898.
