= Allison Weston =

American volleyball player (born 1974)

Personal information
- Full name: Allison Elizabeth Weston
- Born: February 19, 1974 (age 52); Papillion, Nebraska, U.S.
- Height: 6 ft 0 in (1.83 m)
- Education: Nebraska (1992–95)

National team
1997–2000	United States

Allison Elizabeth Weston (born February 19, 1974) is a former indoor volleyball player. She won the 1995 national championship while playing for the University of Nebraska–Lincoln and also played for the United States national team at the 2000 Summer Olympics.

== Career ==
=== High school ===
Weston attended Papillion-La Vista Senior High School, where she played volleyball, basketball, track and field,(high jump) and soccer. In 1992, she was named the Lincoln Journal Star Nebraska Athlete of the Year and the Gatorade Nebraska Player of the Year in basketball. She was inducted into the Nebraska High School Sports Hall of Fame in 2007.

=== College ===
Weston played for the University of Nebraska volleyball team from 1992 to 1995. In her freshman season, she was named the Big Eight Conference Newcomer of the Year. The following year, she was an AVCA All-American and an All-Big Eight Conference selection.

In both 1994 and 1995, Weston was named the Big Eight Conference Player of the Year, while also making the AVCA All-American and All-Big Eight Conference teams. She led Nebraska to the national championship in 1995 and was an AVCA co-National Player of the Year. She finished her college career with 1,778 kills, which set a Nebraska school record. In 1996, she won the Honda Sports Award as the nation's best female collegiate volleyball player.

=== Later career ===
Weston played for the United States national team from 1997 to 2000. She was named the team captain in 1999 and played in the 2000 Summer Olympics.

Weston played professionally in Italy in 2001. She later became an assistant coach for the University of Montana.

Sports Illustrated named her as the best ever female athlete born in Nebraska.

== Personal ==
Weston was born in Papillion, Nebraska, on February 19, 1974. She is 6 feet tall.
