= Sarpy County, Nebraska =

County in Nebraska, United States

- County
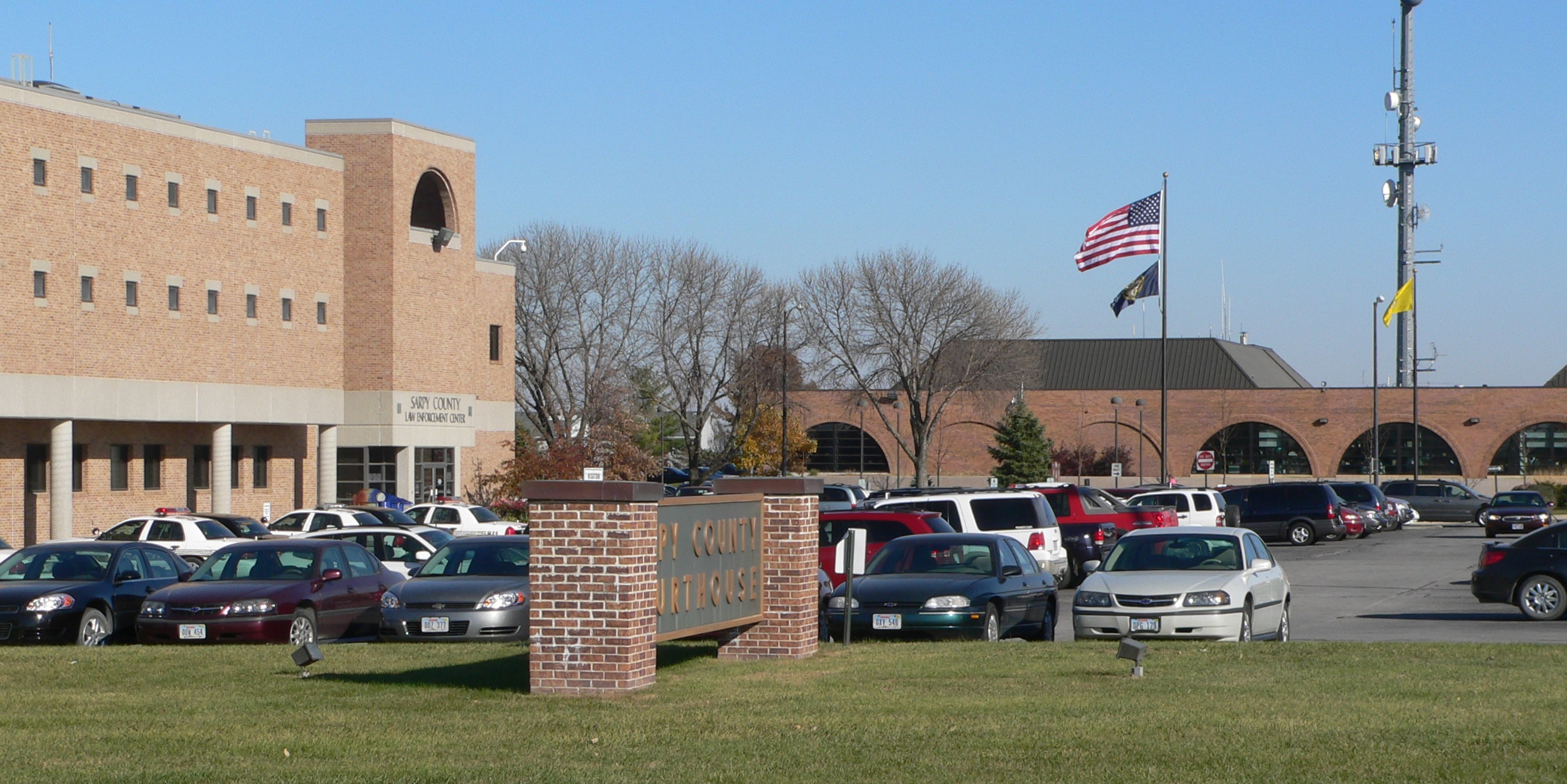
- The Sarpy County Courthouse in Papillion

- Location within the U.S. state of Nebraska
- Coordinates: 41.1151°N 96.1091°W
- Country: United States
- State: Nebraska
- Founded: February 7, 1857
- Named for: Peter A. Sarpy
- Seat: Papillion
- Largest city: Bellevue

Area
  - Total: 247.528 sq mi (641.09 km^{2})
  - Land: 238.005 sq mi (616.43 km^{2})
  - Water: 9.523 sq mi (24.66 km^{2}) 3.85%

Population (2020)
  - Total: 190,604
  - Estimate (2025): 208,303 ▲
  - Density: 800.840/sq mi (309.206/km^{2})
- Time zone: UTC−6 (Central)
  - Summer (DST): UTC−5 (CDT)
- Area code: 402 and 531
- Congressional districts: 1st, 2nd
- Website: sarpy.gov
- • Nebraska county number 77 • Nebraska license plate prefix 59

Sarpy County is a county located in the U.S. state of Nebraska. As of the 2020 census, the population was 190,604, and was estimated to be 208,303 in 2025, making it the third-most populous county in Nebraska. The county seat is Papillion and the largest city is Bellevue.

Sarpy County is part of the Omaha–Council Bluffs metropolitan area.

In the Nebraska license plate system, Sarpy County was represented by the prefix "59" (as it had the 59th-largest number of vehicles registered in the state when the license plate system was established in 1922). In 2002, the state discontinued the 1922 system in the three most populous counties: Douglas, Lancaster, and Sarpy Counties. Many license plates issued in Sarpy County featured the stacked format of the 59 code. The county, just south of Omaha, had grown significantly in population in the decades following 1922 and therefore required five characters rather than the four allowed by a standard double-digit county code.

== History ==
This was part of the territory of the Omaha people. Explored in 1805 by the Lewis and Clark expedition following the Louisiana Purchase of 1803 by the United States, this area was settled by European-American fur traders, adventurers, farmers, and finally, entrepreneurs. All initially depended on the Missouri River as a main transportation corridor and source of water. Sarpy County has served as the springboard for Nebraska's settlement and expansion. The county is named for Peter Sarpy, an early fur trader at Fontenelle's Post in the Bellevue area in the 1840s. He also had Sarpy's post in what became Decatur; Sarpy died in Plattsmouth in 1865.

The area of present Sarpy County was a part of Douglas County until February 7, 1857, when the Territorial Legislature partitioned off that county's southern half and proclaimed it a separate organization.

The Omaha people were forced onto a reservation in the 19th century, losing most of their land to the United States who then opened it for settlement by non-Native Americans who were U.S. citizens or immigrants from certain (mostly European) countries.

Fort Crook, the U.S. Army post south of Bellevue, was established in the 1890s and added Offutt Field in the 1920s. Its Glenn L. Martin Bomber Plant produced over two thousand aircraft during World War II, including the notable B-29's Enola Gay and Bockscar. Offutt Air Force Base was the headquarters of the Strategic Air Command (SAC) during the Cold War and continues as the home of U.S. Strategic Command.

== Geography ==
According to the United States Census Bureau, the county has a total area of 247.528 square miles (641.09 km^{2}), of which 238.005 square miles (616.43 km^{2}) is land and 9.523 square miles (24.66 km^{2}) (3.85%) is water. It is the smallest county in Nebraska by total area.

Sarpy County is bounded on the east by the Missouri River; on the south and west by the Platte River. The county's terrain consists of low rolling hills, cut by several small gullies and drainages that move groundwater to one of these rivers.

=== Major highways ===
- Interstate 80
- U.S. Highway 6
- U.S. Highway 75
- Nebraska Highway 31
- Nebraska Highway 50
- Nebraska Highway 85
- Nebraska Highway 370

=== Transit ===
- Metro Transit

=== Adjacent counties ===
- Douglas County – north
- Pottawattamie County, Iowa – northeast
- Mills County, Iowa – southeast
- Cass County – south
- Saunders County – west

=== Protected areas ===
- Chalco Hills Recreation Area
- Fontenelle Forest Nature Center
- Gifford Point Wildlife Management Area
- Walnut Creek Lake & Recreation

== Demographics ==
Historical population
Census	Pop.	Note	%±
1860	1,201		—
1870	2,913		142.5%
1880	4,481		53.8%
1890	6,875		53.4%
1900	9,080		32.1%
1910	9,274		2.1%
1920	9,370		1.0%
1930	10,402		11.0%
1940	10,835		4.2%
1950	15,693		44.8%
1960	31,281		99.3%
1970	63,696		103.6%
1980	86,015		35.0%
1990	102,583		19.3%
2000	122,595		19.5%
2010	158,840		29.6%
2020	190,604		20.0%
2025 (est.)	208,303	▲	9.3%
U.S. Decennial Census; 1790–1960 1900–1990; 1990–2000 2010–2020

As of the third quarter of 2025, the median home value in Sarpy County was $346,815.

As of the 2024 American Community Survey, there are 77,583 estimated households in Sarpy County with an average of 2.63 persons per household. The county has a median household income of $101,316. Approximately 6.2% of the county's population lives at or below the poverty line. Sarpy County has an estimated 68.2% employment rate, with 42.8% of the population holding a bachelor's degree or higher and 96.5% holding a high school diploma. There were 79,631 housing units at an average density of 334.58 per square mile (129.2/km^{2}).

The top five reported languages (people were allowed to report up to two languages, thus the figures will generally add to more than 100%) were English (87.7%), Spanish (7.7%), Indo-European (2.3%), Asian and Pacific Islander (1.4%), and Other (0.9%).

The median age in the county was 35.6 years.

Sarpy County, Nebraska – racial and ethnic composition Note: the US Census treats Hispanic/Latino as an ethnic category. This table excludes Latinos from the racial categories and assigns them to a separate category. Hispanics/Latinos may be of any race.
Race / ethnicity (NH = non-Hispanic)	Pop. 1980	Pop. 1990	Pop. 2000	Pop. 2010	Pop. 2020
White alone (NH)	78,244 (90.97%)	91,663 (89.35%)	106,823 (87.13%)	133,132 (83.82%)	147,064 (77.16%)
Black or African American alone (NH)	3,687 (4.29%)	5,236 (5.10%)	5,231 (4.27%)	6,119 (3.85%)	7,232 (3.79%)
Native American or Alaska Native alone (NH)	269 (0.31%)	375 (0.37%)	444 (0.36%)	554 (0.35%)	553 (0.29%)
Asian alone (NH)	1,167 (1.36%)	1,856 (1.81%)	2,306 (1.88%)	3,313 (2.09%)	4,726 (2.48%)
Pacific Islander alone (NH)	—	—	106 (0.09%)	157 (0.10%)	224 (0.12%)
Other race alone (NH)	330 (0.38%)	70 (0.07%)	160 (0.13%)	224 (0.14%)	716 (0.38%)
Mixed race or multiracial (NH)	—	—	2,167 (1.77%)	3,772 (2.37%)	10,034 (5.26%)
Hispanic or Latino (any race)	2,318 (2.69%)	3,383 (3.30%)	5,358 (4.37%)	11,569 (7.28%)	20,055 (10.52%)
Total	86,015 (100.00%)	102,583 (100.00%)	122,595 (100.00%)	158,840 (100.00%)	190,604 (100.00%)

=== 2024 estimate ===
As of the 2024 estimate, there were 204,828 people, 77,583 households, and _ families residing in the county. The population density was 26.31 inhabitants per square mile (10.2/km^{2}). There were 79,631 housing units at an average density of 334.58 per square mile (129.2/km^{2}). The racial makeup of the county was 87.3% White (76.4% NH White), 5.0% African American, 0.9% Native American, 3.1% Asian, 0.2% Pacific Islander, _% from some other races and 3.6% from two or more races. Hispanic or Latino people of any race were 12.5% of the population.

=== 2020 census ===
As of the 2020 census, there were 190,604 people, 70,173 households, and 50,364 families residing in the county. The population density was 800.84 inhabitants per square mile (309.2/km^{2}). There were 73,081 housing units at an average density of 307.06 per square mile (118.6/km^{2}). The racial makeup of the county was 80.02% White, 3.91% African American, 0.53% Native American, 2.52% Asian, 0.13% Pacific Islander, 3.71% from some other races and 9.19% from two or more races. Hispanic or Latino people of any race were 10.52% of the population.

There were 70,173 households in the county, of which 37.9% had children under the age of 18 living with them and 21.6% had a female householder with no spouse or partner present. About 22.7% of all households were made up of individuals and 8.4% had someone living alone who was 65 years of age or older.

The median age was 35.4 years. 27.5% of residents were under the age of 18 and 12.6% of residents were 65 years of age or older. For every 100 females there were 98.1 males, and for every 100 females age 18 and over there were 95.5 males age 18 and over.

94.8% of residents lived in urban areas, while 5.2% lived in rural areas.

There were 73,081 housing units, of which 4.0% were vacant. Among occupied housing units, 69.6% were owner-occupied and 30.4% were renter-occupied. The homeowner vacancy rate was 1.0% and the rental vacancy rate was 6.2%.

=== 2010 census ===
As of the 2010 census, there were 158,840 people, 58,102 households, and 41,350 families residing in the county. The population density was 667.38 inhabitants per square mile (257.7/km^{2}). There were 61,938 housing units at an average density of 260.24 per square mile (100.5/km^{2}). The racial makeup of the county was 87.43% White, 3.98% African American, 0.46% Native American, 2.11% Asian, 0.11% Pacific Islander, 2.79% from some other races and 3.12% from two or more races. Hispanic or Latino people of any race were 7.28% of the population.

=== 2000 census ===
As of the 2000 census, there were 122,595 people, 43,426 households, and 33,220 families residing in the county. The population density was 515.09 inhabitants per square mile (198.9/km^{2}). There were 44,981 housing units at an average density of 188.99 per square mile (73.0/km^{2}). The racial makeup of the county was 89.18% White, 4.36% African American, 0.42% Native American, 1.90% Asian, 0.09% Pacific Islander, 1.86% from some other races and 2.20% from two or more races. Hispanic or Latino people of any race were 4.37% of the population.

There were 43,426 households, out of which 43.00% had children under the age of 18 living with them, 63.80% were married couples living together, 9.60% had a female householder with no husband present, and 23.50% were non-families. 18.40% of all households were made up of individuals, and 4.70% had someone living alone who was 65 years of age or older. The average household size was 2.79 and the average family size was 3.21.

The county population contained 30.50% under the age of 18, 9.40% from 18 to 24, 33.80% from 25 to 44, 19.70% from 45 to 64, and 6.60% who were 65 years of age or older. The median age was 32 years. For every 100 females there were 98.80 males. For every 100 females age 18 and over, there were 96.20 males.

The median income for a household in the county was $53,804, and the median income for a family was $59,723. Males had a median income of $37,230 versus $26,816 for females. The per capita income for the county was $21,985. About 3.10% of families and 4.20% of the population were below the poverty line, including 5.30% of those under age 18 and 3.30% of those age 65 or over.

== Government and infrastructure ==
The Sarpy County Sheriff's Department is responsible for enforcing the law within the unincorporated areas of the county. By contract, the department is also responsible for enforcing the law within the city limits of Gretna and Springfield. The cities of Bellevue, La Vista, and Papillion have their own city Police Departments which are primarily responsible for law enforcement within their respective city limits. The Sheriff's Department has secondary responsibility for law enforcement within these three cities, providing essentials such as backup support.

The Sarpy County Law Enforcement Center, built in 1989, is located within the campus of the Sarpy County Courthouse in Papillion. It houses the county's jail facility and the Sarpy County Public Defender's Office. The Bellevue and LaVista City Police Departments also have their own holding cells. The county jail was designed to hold 148 people, but the facility frequently holds more than that number.

Fire protection and emergency medical services are provided by a mix of seven full-career, part-time paid, military, and all-volunteer fire departments, representing various municipalities within the county, plus Offutt Air Force Base.

=== Politics ===
Sarpy County voters have generally voted Republican in national politics. In only one national election since 1948 has the county selected the Democratic Party candidate (as of 2020). Since 1964, only three Democrats - Barack Obama in 2008, Joe Biden in 2020, and Kamala Harris in 2024 have received at least 40 percent of the county's vote. From 1968 to 2016, Republicans always carried Sarpy County by at least 21 points with the exception of a slight drop to 16 points in 2008. However, in 2020, Republican candidate Donald Trump beat Biden only by 11 points, a 92-year low for a winning Republican candidate. In 2024, Sarpy County very narrowly voted for Dan Osborn, an Independent, over incumbent Republican Senator Deb Fischer in the 2024 Senate race; no Democrat filed for this race. Kamala Harris also garnered the highest share of the vote for a Democratic Presidential candidate since the county voted for Lyndon B. Johnson in 1964.

This county was the only one in Nebraska to vote for both Initiative 434 and Initiative 439 in 2024. Those two initiatives dealt with abortion and were contradictory to each other, with the former restricting abortion after the first trimester and the latter intending to protect abortion access through fetal viability.

Political Party	Number of registered voters (April 1, 2026)	Percent
Republican	44.26%	44.26%
Independent	36,437	27.78%
Democratic	33,347	25.42%
Libertarian	2,270	1.73%
Legal Marijuana Now	1,053	0.80%
Total	131,161	100.00%

United States presidential election results for Sarpy County, Nebraska
Year	Republican		Democratic		Third party(ies)	
Year	No.	%	No.	%	No.	%
1880	491	47.86%	516	50.29%	19	1.85%
1884	616	49.32%	610	48.84%	23	1.84%
1888	658	41.00%	875	54.52%	72	4.49%
1892	582	39.17%	351	23.62%	553	37.21%
1896	674	35.18%	1,183	61.74%	59	3.08%
1900	792	41.08%	1,090	56.54%	46	2.39%
1904	998	53.68%	675	36.31%	186	10.01%
1908	912	44.08%	1,090	52.68%	67	3.24%
1912	404	22.53%	857	47.80%	532	29.67%
1916	885	39.19%	1,320	58.46%	53	2.35%
1920	1,662	59.78%	1,027	36.94%	91	3.27%
1924	1,411	38.86%	1,247	34.34%	973	26.80%
1928	2,011	51.04%	1,900	48.22%	29	0.74%
1932	1,148	26.52%	3,112	71.89%	69	1.59%
1936	1,569	33.75%	3,030	65.18%	50	1.08%
1940	2,165	46.04%	2,537	53.96%	0	0.00%
1944	2,641	49.88%	2,654	50.12%	0	0.00%
1948	2,367	47.32%	2,635	52.68%	0	0.00%
1952	3,649	59.06%	2,529	40.94%	0	0.00%
1956	3,826	60.47%	2,501	39.53%	0	0.00%
1960	4,672	55.30%	3,777	44.70%	0	0.00%
1964	4,418	44.18%	5,581	55.82%	0	0.00%
1968	6,019	52.48%	3,506	30.57%	1,945	16.96%
1972	11,514	74.68%	3,904	25.32%	0	0.00%
1976	11,917	60.44%	7,385	37.46%	414	2.10%
1980	15,552	67.03%	5,689	24.52%	1,961	8.45%
1984	20,192	74.34%	6,838	25.18%	130	0.48%
1988	20,192	64.54%	10,947	34.99%	146	0.47%
1992	20,516	50.44%	10,741	26.41%	9,416	23.15%
1996	23,023	57.74%	12,806	32.11%	4,048	10.15%
2000	28,979	64.00%	14,637	32.33%	1,662	3.67%
2004	40,163	68.85%	17,455	29.92%	716	1.23%
2008	38,816	57.06%	28,010	41.18%	1,196	1.76%
2012	43,213	60.45%	26,671	37.31%	1,606	2.25%
2016	45,143	56.02%	28,033	34.79%	7,404	9.19%
2020	51,979	54.04%	41,206	42.84%	3,008	3.13%
2024	55,567	54.85%	43,825	43.26%	1,907	1.88%

== Communities ==
=== Cities ===
- Bellevue
- Gretna
- La Vista
- Papillion (county seat)
- Springfield

=== Census-designated places ===
- Beacon View
- Chalco
- La Platte
- Linoma Beach
- Melia
- Offutt AFB
- Richfield

=== Other unincorporated communities ===
- Avery
- Gilmore
- Meadow
- Portal

=== Census divisions ===
Sarpy County is divided into the following census divisions called precincts, defined by the boundaries of the original townships,

- Bellevue Second I
- Bellevue Second II
- Bellevue Second III
- Bellevue Second IV
- Fairview
- Forest City No. 1
- Forest City No. 2
- Gilmore I
- Gilmore II
- Highland I
- Highland II
- LaPlatte I
- LaPlatte II
- La Vista
- Melia-Forest City
- Papillion
- Papillion Second I
- Papillion Second II
- Platford-Springfield I
- Platford-Springfield II
- Richland I
- Richland II
- Richland III
- Richland IV
- Richland V
- Richland VI
- Richland VII
- Richland VIII
- Springfield

== Education ==
School districts include:

- Ashland-Greenwood Public Schools #1, Ashland
- Bellevue Public Schools #1, Bellevue
- Gretna Public Schools #37, Gretna
- Louisville Public Schools #32, Louisville
- Millard Public Schools #17, Omaha
- Omaha Public Schools #1, Omaha
- Papillion-La Vista Public Schools #27, Papillion
- Springfield Platteview Community Schools #46, Springfield

== See also ==
- National Register of Historic Places listings in Sarpy County, Nebraska
