= Papillion-La Vista South High School =

Location
- 10799 Highway 370; Papillion, Nebraska; United States; 41°08′42″N 96°04′44″W

Information
- Type: Public high school
- Established: 2003
- School district: Papillion-La Vista Public Schools
- Principal: Jeff Spilker
- Teaching staff: 118.58 (on an FTE basis)
- Grades: 9-12
- Enrollment: 1,982 (2023-2024)
- Student to teacher ratio: 16.71
- Colors: Blue, black, and silver
- Mascot: Titan
- Website: Papillion-La Vista South H.S.

Papillion-La Vista South High School (commonly referred to as Papio South, PLSHS, PLSouth, or PLS) is a high school in Papillion, Nebraska, United States. It is one of two high schools in the Papillion-La Vista Public School District. The school's principal is Jeff Spilker.

== History ==
Papillion-La Vista South High School opened in the fall of 2003. A successful 2018 referendum allocated money for the expansion of Papio South's facilities to accommodate over 2,000 students.

== Academics ==
Papillion-La Vista South offers dual credit classes through the University of Nebraska Omaha.

== Extracurricular activities ==
=== Athletics ===
Papilion-La Vista South has won eighteen state championships: girls' cross-country in 2010, 2014, and 2015; girls' track and field in 2023, 2025, and 2026; volleyball in 2010, 2011, 2012, 2019, 2021, 2022, 2024, and 2025; boys’ cross-country in 2017; boys' basketball in 2025 and baseball in 2010 and 2011. The Papillion South student section is known as the "Black Hole".

=== Performing arts ===
PLS has three competitive show choirs, the mixed-gender "Titanium", "Titan Express", as well as the all-female "Titan Radiance". The program also hosts an annual competition, the "Titan Classic". The choirs are backed by a state winning showband, "Platinum".

The school also has a competitive marching band and hosts an annual competition, "Titan Marching Invitational" for that discipline. The Titan Marching Band won the Nebraska class AA and Grand Championship at the NSBA state marching contest in 2021. The school also has two jazz bands, the top group "Silver Tones" and the lower group "Blue Notes". Both jazz bands have a reputation for Superior ratings at competitions.

Papio South's band program also has a winter arts program that includes winter winds, winter guard, and winter percussion. All of these groups compete in WGI competitions, with guard winning a Regional in Denver, CO, their Winds placing 4th in Winds Scholastic A World Finals, and their Percussion group placing 28th in Percussion Scholastic World Prelims.

The school formerly had a "Rap Club" which went on to produce four albums, Room D05 (2015), GOAT (2016), FEUD (2017), and Mixed Emotions (2018).
