= Papillion-La Vista Public Schools =

School district in Nebraska, United States

Papillion-La Vista Community Schools

Location
- Papillion, Nebraska United States

District information
- Motto: Be Known for Greatness
- Grades: K-12
- Established: 1872
- Superintendent: Andrew Rikli

Students and staff
- Students: 12,038
- Staff: 1,719

Other information
- Website: www.plcschools.org

The Papillion-La Vista School District is headquartered in Papillion, Nebraska, United States. The district covers most of Papillion, almost all of La Vista, and small portions of Bellevue, Chalco, and Offutt AFB. The district was originally established as the Papillion School District, but with the rapid growth of La Vista (incorporated in 1960), the name of the city was officially added to the school district's name in 1987 by former Superintendent Roger Miller. The school district serves over 12,000 students and is an official Purple Star school disctrict.

== Schools ==
=== Middle and High Schools ===
The district has two high schools (Papillion-La Vista South High School and Papillion La Vista Senior High School) although a third is planned for the future. It is also home to three junior high schools (Papillion Middle School, La Vista Middle School, and Liberty Middle School). Most students from Papillion Junior High graduate to Papillion-La Vista South High School, while students from La Vista Junior High move on to attend Papillion-La Vista Senior High School. Liberty Middle School was opened in 2016 as a means to ease the over-enrolling of students in the other two middle schools and has a mixture of students who would have gone to either of the two middle schools.

School	Mascot	Location	Grades	Enrollment	Opened
La Vista Middle School	Monarchs	7900 Edgewood Blvd, La Vista, NE 68128	7-8	716	1976
Liberty Middle School	Eagles	10820 Wittmus Dr, Papillion, NE 68046	7-8	499	2016
Papillion Middle School	Titans	423 S. Washington Street, Papillion, NE 68046	7-8	659	1957
Papillion-La Vista High School	Monarchs	303 E. Cary Street, Papillion, NE 68046	9-12	1,893	1971
Papillion-La Vista South High School	Titans	10799 Highway 370, Papillion, NE 68046	9-12	1,965	2003

=== Elementary Schools ===
School	Mascot	Location	Grades	Enrollment	Opened
Anderson Grove Elementary School	Quails	11820 S. 37th Street, Bellevue, NE 68123	K-6	315	1985
Ashbury Elementary School	Knights	11740 S. 120th Street, Papillion, NE 68046	K-6	279	2020
Bell Elementary School	Bulldogs	7909 Reed Street, Papillion, NE 68046	K-6	476	2009
Carriage Hill Elementary School	Cougars	400 Cedardale Road, Papillion, NE 68046	K-6	383	1969
G. Stanley Hall Elementary School	Hawks	7600 S. 72nd Street, La Vista, NE 68128	K-6	409	1963
Golden Hills Elementary School	Eagles	2912 Coffey Avenue, Bellevue, NE 68123	K-6	260	1976
Hickory Hill Elementary School	Huskies	1307 Rogers Drive, Papillion, NE 68046	K-6	393	1985
La Vista West Elementary School	Wolves	7821 Terry Drive, La Vista, NE 68128	K-6	310	1963
Lincoln View Elementary School	Leopards	9922 Prospect Street, Papillion, NE 68046	K-6		2026
Parkview Heights Elementary School	Panthers	7609 S. 89th Street, La Vista, NE 68128	K-6	426	1968
Patriot Elementary School	Lions	1701 Hardwood Drive, Papillion, NE 68046	K-6	400	2008
Portal Elementary School	Stars	9920 Brentwood Drive, La Vista, NE 68128	K-6	455	2003
Prairie Queen Elementary School	Mustangs	10520 S. 123rd Avenue, Papillion, NE 68046	K-6	497	2015
Rumsey Station Elementary School	Engineers	110 Eagle Ridge Drive, Papillion, NE 68133	K-6	379	1995
Tara Heights Elementary School	Tigers	700 Tara Road, Papillion, NE 68046	K-6	437	1960
Trumble Park Elementary School	Roadrunners	500 Valley Road, Papillion, NE 68046	K-6	376	1960
Walnut Creek Elementary School	Wildcats	720 Fenwick Street, Papillion, NE 68046	K-6	532	2000

=== Alternative/Specialized Schools ===
School	Mascot	Location	Grades	Enrollment	Opened
IDEAL Alternative School		1104 Applewood Drive, Papillion, NE 68046	9-12	75	1996

== Superintendent ==
Superintendent Rick Black, who began in 2007, announced his retirement at the end of the 2012–2013 school year. The current superintendent is Andrew Rikli, who began on July 1, 2013.
