= La Vista, Nebraska =

City in Sarpy County, Nebraska, United States

- City
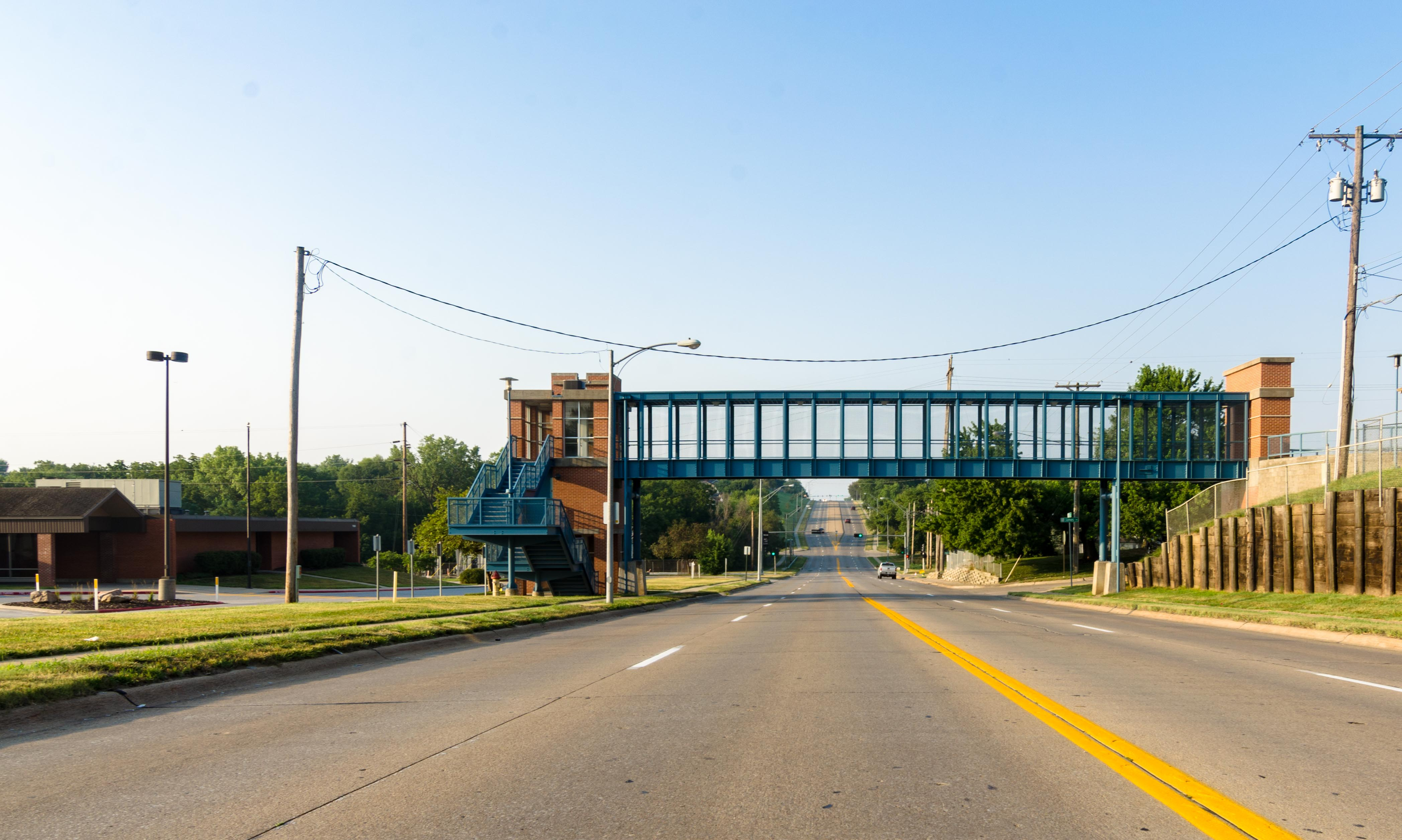
- View south on 72nd Street just south of Harrison Street in La Vista, July 2017

- Location of La Vista within Nebraska and Sarpy County
- Coordinates: 41°10′53″N 96°04′02″W
- Country: United States
- State: Nebraska
- County: Sarpy

Area
  - Total: 3.28 sq mi (8.50 km^{2})
  - Land: 3.28 sq mi (8.49 km^{2})
  - Water: 0.0039 sq mi (0.01 km^{2})
- Elevation: 1,096 ft (334 m)

Population (2020)
  - Total: 16,746
  - Density: 5,108.6/sq mi (1,972.44/km^{2})
- Time zone: UTC-6 (Central (CST))
  - Summer (DST): UTC-5 (CDT)
- ZIP code: 68128
- Area code: 402
- FIPS code: 31-26385
- GNIS feature ID: 2395575
- Website: cityoflavista.org

La Vista is a city in Sarpy County, Nebraska, United States. The population was 16,746 at the 2020 census, making it the 12th most populous city in Nebraska. The city was incorporated on February 23, 1960.

== Description ==
La Vista is a suburb of Omaha. It is bordered by the cities of Omaha and Ralston on the north, Papillion on the south, Bellevue on the east, and Interstate 80 to the west. La Vista is Sarpy County's third largest city, after Bellevue and Papillion, the county seat.

== History ==
La Vista was established in 1959 by a developer who planned to build 335 homes on La Vista's land. Priced at a modest $9,999 each, it soon became known as "House of Nines." At the time, the assessed valuation was just over $1,000,000. The first families began moving into their homes in January 1960. La Vista (meaning "the view") was selected as its name by these "early settlers" because of the beautiful scenic view of the Big Papio Creek basin southeast of the development.

== Geography ==
According to the United States Census Bureau, the city has a total area of 3.28 square miles (8.50 km^{2}), all land.

== Demographics ==
Historical population
Census	Pop.	Note	%±
1970	4,858		—
1980	9,588		97.4%
1990	9,840		2.6%
2000	11,699		18.9%
2010	15,758		34.7%
2020	16,746		6.3%
U.S. Decennial Census

=== Income and poverty ===
The 2016–2020 5-year American Community Survey estimates show that the median household income was $70,184 (with a margin of error of +/- $4,275) and the median family income $84,777 (+/- $5,784). Males had a median income of $42,389 (+/- $3,203) versus $33,504 (+/- $3,262) for females. The median income for those above 16 years old was $38,068 (+/- $2,397). Approximately, 2.4% of families and 5.4% of the population were below the poverty line, including 5.4% of those under the age of 18 and 3.9% of those ages 65 or over.

=== 2020 census ===
As of the 2020 census, La Vista had a population of 16,746, with 7,022 households and 4,213 families. The median age was 36.2 years. 22.9% of residents were under the age of 18 and 14.3% were 65 years of age or older. For every 100 females there were 94.2 males, and for every 100 females age 18 and over, there were 91.7 males age 18 and over.

The population density was 5,105.5 per square mile (1,972.4/km^{2}). There were 7,249 housing units, of which 3.1% were vacant. The homeowner vacancy rate was 0.7% and the rental vacancy rate was 4.6%.

Of the 7,022 households, 30.0% had children under the age of 18 living in them. Of all households, 43.1% were married-couple households, 19.7% were households with a male householder and no spouse or partner present, and 28.5% were households with a female householder and no spouse or partner present. About 30.8% of all households were made up of individuals and 9.6% had someone living alone who was 65 years of age or older. The average household size was 2.4 and the average family size was 3.1.

100.0% of residents lived in urban areas, while 0.0% lived in rural areas.

Racial composition as of the 2020 census
Race	Number	Percent
White	13,176	78.7%
Black or African American	788	4.7%
American Indian and Alaska Native	61	0.4%
Asian	598	3.6%
Native Hawaiian and Other Pacific Islander	19	0.1%
Some other race	706	4.2%
Two or more races	1,398	8.3%
Hispanic or Latino (of any race)	1,864	11.1%

=== 2010 census ===
At the 2010 census there were 15,758 people, 6,419 households, and 4,058 families living in the city. The population density was 3,681.8 inhabitants per square mile (1,421.6/km^{2}). There were 6,670 housing units at an average density of 1,558.4 per square mile (601.7/km^{2}). The racial makeup of the city was 86.9% White, 3.9% African American, 0.4% Native American, 3.2% Asian, 0.1% Pacific Islander, 2.6% from other races, and 2.8% from two or more races. Hispanic or Latino of any race were 6.5%.

Of the 6,419 households 34.5% had children under the age of 18 living with them, 45.7% were married couples living together, 12.9% had a female householder with no husband present, 4.6% had a male householder with no wife present, and 36.8% were non-families. 28.7% of households were one person and 5.1% were one person aged 65 or older. The average household size was 2.45 and the average family size was 3.06.

The median age was 32.1 years. 25.9% of residents were under the age of 18; 10.3% were between the ages of 18 and 24; 31.7% were from 25 to 44; 24.6% were from 45 to 64; and 7.5% were 65 or older. The gender makeup of the city was 48.3% male and 51.7% female.

=== 2000 census ===
At the 2000 census, there were 11,699 people, 4,404 households, and 3,131 families living in the city. The population density was 4,114.8 inhabitants per square mile (1,588.7/km^{2}). There were 4,511 housing units at an average density of 1,586.6 per square mile (612.6/km^{2}). The racial makeup of the city was 90.45% White, 2.94% African American, 0.39% Native American, 2.35% Asian, 0.10% Pacific Islander, 1.62% from other races, and 2.14% from two or more races. Hispanic or Latino of any race were 4.15% of the population.

Of the 4,404 households 40.0% had children under the age of 18 living with them, 52.5% were married couples living together, 14.9% had a female householder with no husband present, and 28.9% were non-families. 21.4% of households were one person and 3.3% were one person aged 65 or older. The average household size was 2.66 and the average family size was 3.13.

The age distribution was 29.8% under the age of 18, 10.4% from 18 to 24, 36.4% from 25 to 44, 18.9% from 45 to 64, and 4.5% 65 or older. The median age was 30 years. For every 100 females, there were 94.6 males. For every 100 females age 18 and over, there were 89.6 males.

The median household income was $47,280, and the median family income was $52,819. Males had a median income of $34,732 versus $25,076 for females. The per capita income for the city was $19,612. About 4.4% of families and 5.7% of the population were below the poverty line, including 7.9% of those under age 18 and 3.1% of those age 65 or over.

== Schools ==
Almost all of La Vista falls within the Papillion-La Vista Public School system, while a small section is in Millard Public Schools.

Elementary schools (Grades K–6)

- Portal Elementary School
- Parkview Heights Elementary School
- La Vista West Elementary School
- G. Stanley Hall Elementary School

Middle school (Grades 7–8)

- La Vista Junior High School

High school (Grades 9–12)

- Papillion-La Vista Senior High School

== Transportation ==
Transit service to the city is provided by Metro Transit. Route 93 serves the city on weekdays.

== See also ==
- List of municipalities in Nebraska
