= Papillion, Nebraska =

- City and county seat
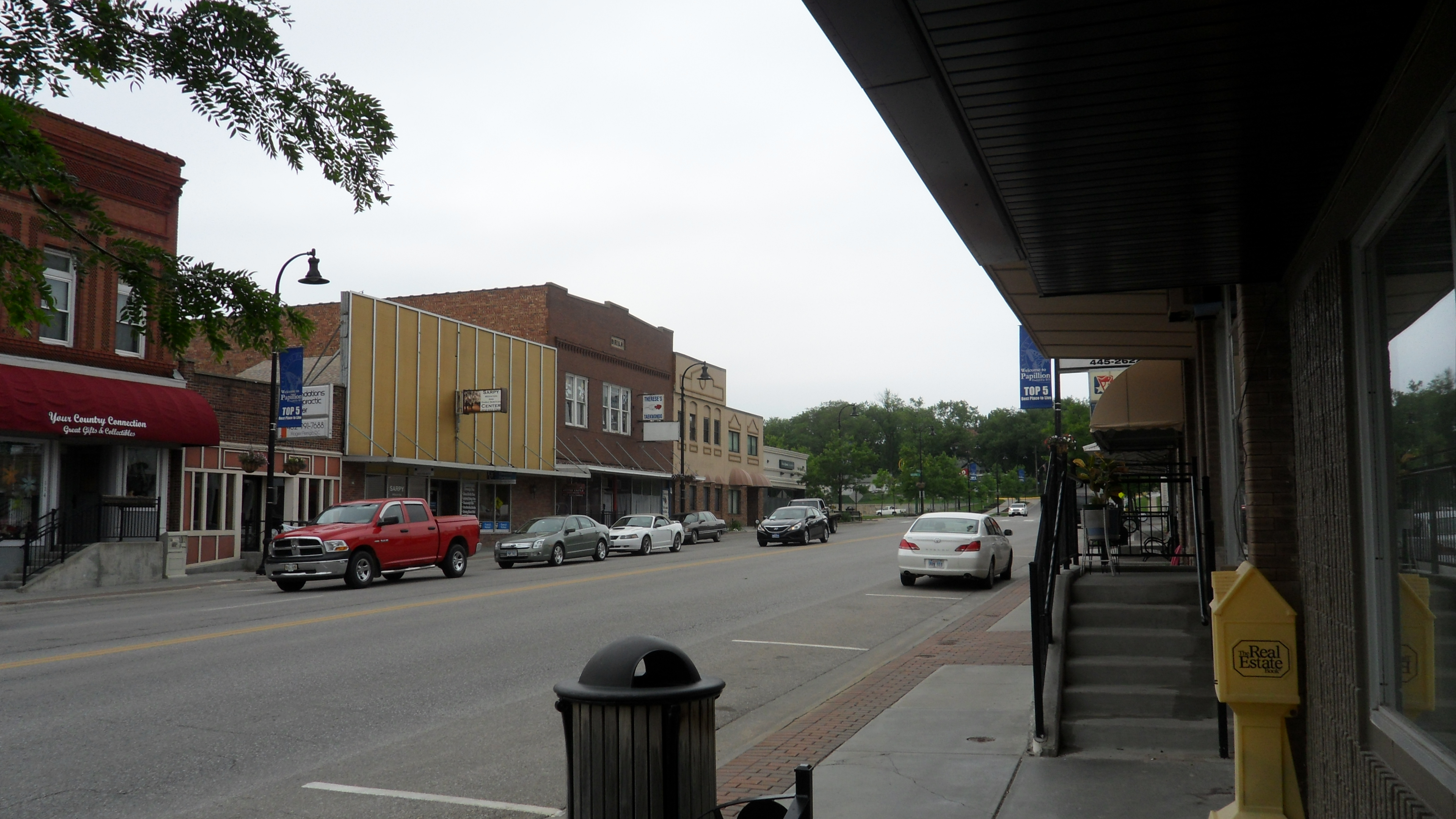
- Downtown Papillion along Nebraska Highway 85, June 2011

- Location of Papillion within Nebraska and Sarpy County
- Coordinates: 41.157°N 96.043°W
- Country: United States
- State: Nebraska
- County: Sarpy

Area
  - Total: 12.27 sq mi (31.77 km^{2})
  - Land: 11.99 sq mi (31.06 km^{2})
  - Water: 0.27 sq mi (0.70 km^{2})
- Elevation: 1,032 ft (315 m)

Population (2020)
  - Total: 24,159
  - Density: 2,014.3/sq mi (777.73/km^{2})
- Time zone: UTC−6 (Central (CST))
  - Summer (DST): UTC−5 (CDT)
- ZIP Codes: 68046, 68133, 68157
- Area code: 402
- FIPS code: 31-38295
- GNIS feature ID: 2396139
- Website: papillion.org

Papillion is a city in and the county seat of Sarpy County, Nebraska, United States. The city developed in the 1870s as a railroad town and is a southwest suburb of Omaha. The city is part of the larger five-county metro area of Omaha. Papillion's population was 24,159 at the 2020 census, making it the 7th most populous city in Nebraska. Its growth since the late 20th century has reflected Omaha's.

== Description ==
The city was part of territory claimed by France through the eighteenth century. Early French explorers named it after the creek of the same name which flows through its center. The name Papillion is derived from the French term (papillon) for butterfly. According to local tradition, the explorers named the creek Papillon because they saw so many butterflies along its grassy banks. The spelling was changed through a transliteration of the French word.

Papillion was platted in 1870 when the railroad was extended to that point. Papillion (sometimes referred to as "Papio" by its residents) is one of the last of the late 19th-century, Paris-inspired frontier cities left in the Midwestern United States.

Halleck Park, a recreation area in the heart of the city, includes many trails, open spaces, trees and a number of areas of interest, including Papio Fun Park, Papio Bay Aquatic Park, Papio Pool, and Papio Bowl. The park also offers tennis courts, volleyball courts, playgrounds, "The Duck Pond", Monarch Field ("The Pit"), and E.A. Fricke Field.

It also has nine other softball diamonds within the park for youth. The diamonds are sited on three fields: Halleck, Blonde, and Papio Bay. Village Park, Papio Bay Aquatic Center (including two water slides and a zero depth pool) and Walnut Creek recreational park are among the other recreational amenities in the city.

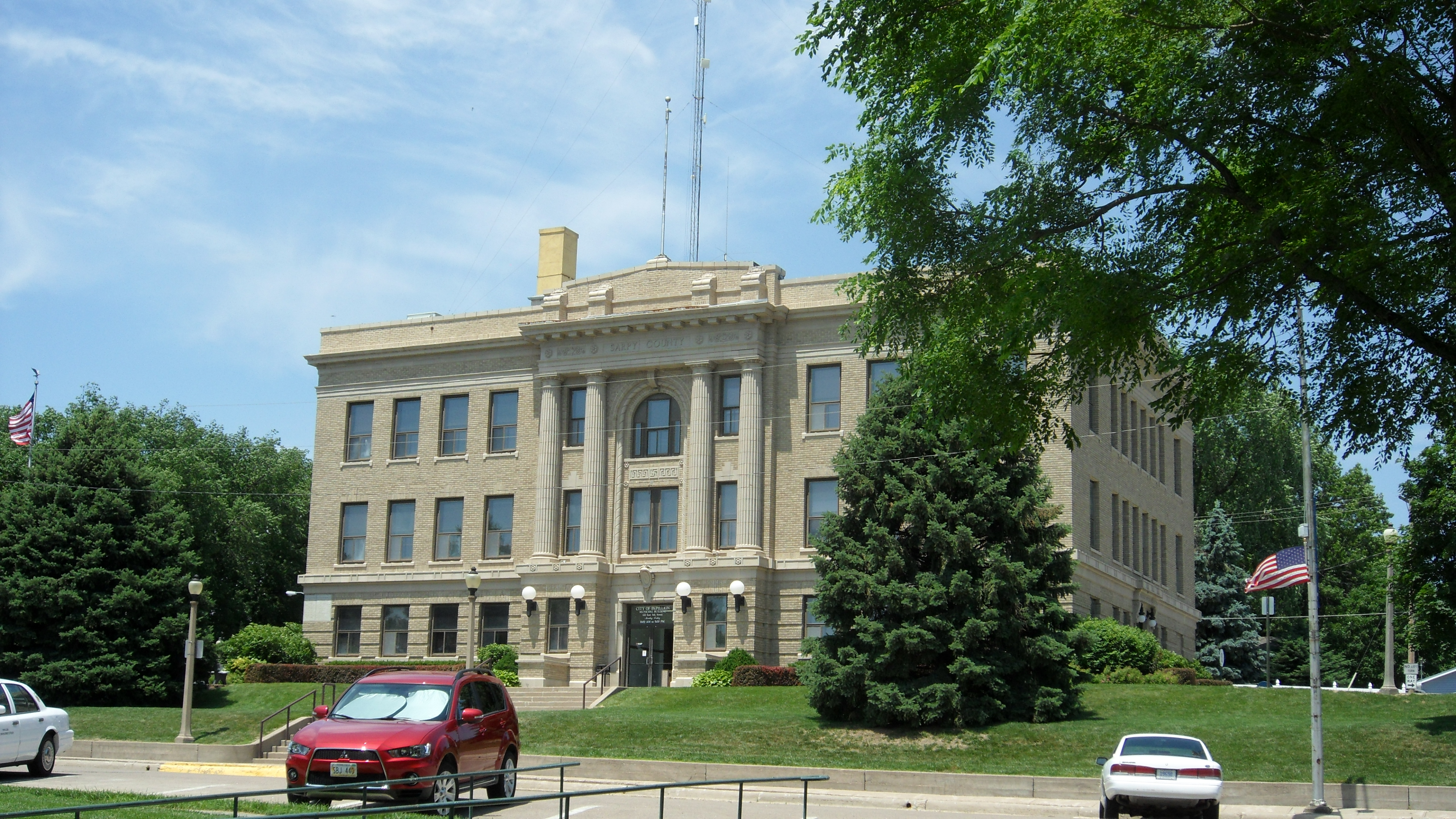
Papillion City Hall, June 2011

Papillion Middle School is in the downtown area south of Papio Creek; the building formerly was used as the high school until August 1971. The former junior high was located directly west, across the street.

Also downtown are the Old A.W. Clarke banking house, Sump Memorial Library, Portal One-Room School House, Papillion Municipal Building (Sarpy County Courthouse until 1970), and the John Sautter House. Other areas of interest in Papillion include the Sarpy County Court House and Jail, Shadow Lake Towne Center, and Midlands Hospital, all along Nebraska Highway 370 in the southern portion of the city.

Papillion has a Triple-A baseball team, the Omaha Storm Chasers, formerly the Omaha Royals. Located three miles (5 km) southwest of the city on Highway 370 in unincorporated Sarpy County, Werner Park opened in 2011 as the new home of the Storm Chasers, then playing in the Pacific Coast League (PCL). After 42 years at Rosenblatt Stadium in south Omaha, the Royals moved out following the 2010 season and changed their nickname to Storm Chasers. They have been the only Triple-A affiliate of the Kansas City Royals, an expansion club that entered the American League in 1969. In conjunction with Major League Baseball's restructuring of the minor leagues in 2021, the Storm Chasers were placed into the new Triple-A East, which was renamed the International League in 2022.

== Geography ==
According to the U.S. Census Bureau, the city has a total area of 6.47 square miles (16.76 km^{2}), of which 6.45 square miles (16.71 km^{2}) is land and 0.02 square miles (0.05 km^{2}) is water.

=== Climate ===
Climate data for Papillion, Nebraska
Month	Jan	Feb	Mar	Apr	May	Jun	Jul	Aug	Sep	Oct	Nov	Dec	Year
Mean daily maximum °F (°C)	32 (0)	38 (3)	50 (10)	63 (17)	74 (23)	84 (29)	87 (31)	85 (29)	77 (25)	65 (18)	48 (9)	35 (2)	62 (16)
Mean daily minimum °F (°C)	12 (−11)	18 (−8)	28 (−2)	40 (4)	51 (11)	61 (16)	66 (19)	64 (18)	54 (12)	41 (5)	28 (−2)	16 (−9)	40 (4)
Average precipitation inches (mm)	0.77 (20)	0.80 (20)	2.13 (54)	2.94 (75)	4.44 (113)	3.95 (100)	3.86 (98)	3.21 (82)	3.17 (81)	2.21 (56)	1.82 (46)	0.92 (23)	30.22 (768)
Source: The Weather Channel

== Demographics ==
Historical population
Census	Pop.	Note	%±
1880	444		—
1890	600		35.1%
1900	594		−1.0%
1910	624		5.1%
1920	666		6.7%
1930	718		7.8%
1940	763		6.3%
1950	1,034		35.5%
1960	2,235		116.2%
1970	5,606		150.8%
1980	6,399		14.1%
1990	10,372		62.1%
2000	16,363		57.8%
2010	18,894		15.5%
2020	24,159		27.9%
U.S. Decennial Census

=== 2020 census ===
As of the 2020 census, Papillion had a population of 24,159, 9,003 households, and 6,508 families. The population density was 2,014.9 per square mile (777.8/km^{2}).

There were 9,325 housing units, of which 3.5% were vacant. The homeowner vacancy rate was 0.6% and the rental vacancy rate was 6.6%.

Of the 9,003 households, 35.5% had children under the age of 18 living in them. Of all households, 58.9% were married-couple households, 13.5% were households with a male householder and no spouse or partner present, and 22.3% were households with a female householder and no spouse or partner present. About 22.7% of all households were made up of individuals and 10.5% had someone living alone who was 65 years of age or older. The average household size was 2.7 and the average family size was 3.1.

The median age was 38.5 years. 25.4% of residents were under the age of 18 and 15.8% of residents were 65 years of age or older. For every 100 females there were 96.6 males, and for every 100 females age 18 and over there were 93.0 males age 18 and over.

99.8% of residents lived in urban areas, while 0.2% lived in rural areas.

Racial composition as of the 2020 census
Race	Number	Percent
White	20,451	84.7%
Black or African American	766	3.2%
American Indian and Alaska Native	112	0.5%
Asian	398	1.6%
Native Hawaiian and Other Pacific Islander	15	0.1%
Some other race	521	2.2%
Two or more races	1,896	7.8%
Hispanic or Latino (of any race)	1,827	7.6%

The 2016–2020 5-year American Community Survey estimates show that the median household income was $90,000 (with a margin of error of +/- $5,784) and the median family income $107,942 (+/- $7,167). Males had a median income of $50,140 (+/- $5,121) versus $34,647 (+/- $3,077) for females. The median income for those above 16 years old was $40,496 (+/- $2,017). Approximately, 2.9% of families and 4.0% of the population were below the poverty line, including 4.3% of those under the age of 18 and 5.5% of those ages 65 or over.

=== 2010 census ===
As of the 2010 census, there were 18,894 people, 6,925 households, and 5,079 families living in the city. The population density was 2,929.3 inhabitants per square mile (1,131.0/km^{2}). There were 7,240 housing units at an average density of 1,122.5 per square mile (433.4/km^{2}). The racial makeup of the city was 90.7% White, 3.3% African American, 0.4% Native American, 1.5% Asian, 1.5% from other races, and 2.7% from two or more races. Hispanic or Latino people of any race were 5.2% of the population.

There were 6,925 households, of which 38.1% had children under the age of 18 living with them, 59.5% were married couples living together, 10.1% had a female householder with no husband present, 3.7% had a male householder with no wife present, and 26.7% were non-families. 22.5% of all households were made up of individuals, and 9% had someone living alone who was 65 years of age or older. The average household size was 2.68 and the average family size was 3.15.

The median age in the city was 36.8 years. 27.3% of residents were under the age of 18; 9.1% were between the ages of 18 and 24; 24.3% were from 25 to 44; 28.5% were from 45 to 64; and 11% were 65 years of age or older. The gender makeup of the city was 48.8% male and 51.2% female.

== Politics ==
Papillion is divided into four wards, with two councilmembers elected from each. One seat for each ward is up for election every two years, with each term lasting four years. The mayor is the head of the city council and is elected at-large to four-year terms. The council meets every two weeks. Following former Mayor James Blinn's resignation on July 7, 2009, city council president David Black succeeded to become mayor of Papillion. He was elected in 2010 for his first full term; as of October 2022, he had been mayor for 13 years, running unopposed in the 2022 election cycle.

== Schools ==
Papillion is part of the Papillion-La Vista Public School District, which includes two high schools, three middle schools and fifteen public elementary schools. Papillion-La Vista South High School, the newer of the two high schools, opened in 2003 and is located in southwest Papillion. Opened in 1971, Papillion-La Vista High School is in the northern part of the city, close to the La Vista border; the original high school in central Papillion opened 150 years ago in 1876; La Vista was formally added to the school's name in 1987. The school district has well over 8,000 students and is one of the fastest-growing districts in Nebraska.

Papillion was home to Nebraska Christian College, accredited by the Association for Biblical Higher Education; it closed in 2020.

== Transportation ==
Transit service to the city is provided by Metro Transit. Route 93 serves the city on weekdays.

== Notable people ==
- Don Bacon, U.S. representative
- Jordy Bahl, college softball player
- Abbie Cobb, actress and author
- Brandon Curran, professional soccer player; defender
- Merle Curti, historian
- Cade Johnson, professional football wide receiver
- Alonzo Martinez, mixed martial artist
- Chris Petersen, guitarist
- Amber Rolfzen, professional volleyball player
- Becca Swanson, powerlifter and wrestler
- Allison Weston, volleyball player

== See also ==
- List of municipalities in Nebraska
