= Bennett House =

Bennett House may refer to:

in the United States

(by state then city)

- Nathan Bennett House, Madison, Georgia, listed on the National Register of Historic Places (NRHP) in Morgan County
- Jamieson-Bennett House, Indianapolis, Indiana, NRHP-listed in Marion County
- Edward H. Bennett House and Studio, Lake Forest, Illinois, NRHP-listed in Lake County
- Bennett Plantation House, Alexandria, Louisiana, NRHP-listed in Rapides Parish
- Brame-Bennett House, Clinton, Louisiana, listed on the NRHP-listed in East Feliciana Parish
- Nathaniel and Elizabeth Bennett House, Norway, Maine, NRHP-listed in Oxford County
- Bennett-Kelly Farm, Sykesville, Maryland
- Lord-Baylies-Bennett House, Taunton, Massachusetts
- Bennett-Shattuck House, Groton, Massachusetts
- Henry Bennett House, Ann Arbor, Michigan, NRHP-listed in Washtenaw County
- Bennett–McBride House, Minneapolis, Minnesota, NRHP-listed in Hennepin County
- Bennett-Tobler-Pace-Oliver House, Jackson, Missouri, NRHP-listed
- John W. Bennett House, Brownville, Nebraska, NRHP-listed in Nemaha County
- Bennett Family House, Monticello, New York, NRHP-listed
- Wyckoff-Bennett Homestead, New York, New York
- Lane-Bennett House, Raleigh, North Carolina, NRHP-listed
- George Bennett House, Harrison, Ohio, NRHP-listed
- Bennett–Williams House, The Dalles, Oregon, NRHP-listed
- Bennett House hotel, Salem, Oregon
- Whipple-Angell-Bennett House, North Providence, Rhode Island
- Gov. Thomas Bennett House, Charleston, South Carolina
- Bennett House (Franklin, Tennessee)
- Mosby-Bennett House, Memphis, Tennessee, NRHP-listed in Shelby County
- M. D. Bennett House, Cuero, Texas, listed on the NRHP-listed in DeWitt County
- Neighbor-Bennett House, Fall City, Washington, NRHP-listed in King County
- Jonathan M. Bennett House, Weston, West Virginia, NRHP-listed
- H. H. Bennett Studio, Wisconsin Dells, Wisconsin, NRHP-listed

== See also ==
- Bennett Building (disambiguation)
