= George Bennett =

George Bennett, Bennette, or Bennet may refer to:

== Politics and law ==
- George Bennett (Ontario politician) (1888–1948), Canadian politician, mayor of Windsor
- George Bennett (Wisconsin politician) (1810–1888), Wisconsin state senator
- George C. Bennett (Irish politician) (1877–1963), Irish Fine Gael politician, represented Limerick
- George C. Bennett (New York politician), (1824–1885), American newspaper publisher and New York State assemblyman
- George Henry Bennett (1850–1908), Scottish-born Australian brewer and politician

== Religion ==
- George Bennett (bishop) (1875–1946), Roman Catholic Bishop of Aberdeen
- George Bennet (hebraist) (1750–1835), Scottish presbyterian minister and Hebraist
- George Bennet (missionary) (1774–1841), English-born Christian missionary to India and Far-East countries

== Sports ==
- George Bennett (Australian cricketer) (1906–1983), Australian cricketer
- George Bennett (Australian rules footballer) (1911–1974), Australian professional football player
- George Bennett (cricketer, born 1829) (1829–1886), English cricketer
- George Bennett (cricketer, born 1832) (1832–1913), English cricketer
- George Bennett (cricketer, born 1883) (1883–1966), English cricketer, British Army officer and solicitor
- George Bennett (cyclist) (born 1990), New Zealand road cyclist
- George Bennett (rugby) (1913–1970), Welsh rugby union and rugby league player
- George Bennet (pastoralist) (1870–1928), Australian pastoralist and racehorse owner
- George Bennette (1901–1984), American baseball player

== Others ==
- George Bennett (admiral) (1926–1996), Australian admiral
- George Bennett (murderer) (died 1880), Canadian executed for murder of George Brown
- George Bennett (naturalist) (1804–1893), English-born Australian physician and naturalist
- George Bennett (organist) (1817–1854), English musician in South Australia
- George Bennett (probability theory), (fl. 1962) proved Bennett's inequality in probability theory
- George Augustus Bennett (1807–1845), English military engineer
- George John Bennett (1800–1879), English Shakespearean actor
- George John Bennett (organist) (1863–1930), English cathedral organist and composer
- George Bennet, 1st Baronet (died c. 1700), of the Bennet baronets
- George Bennet, 7th Earl of Tankerville (1852–1931), British peer, cowpuncher, circus clown, and revival meeting singer

== Other uses ==
- George Bennett House, historic house near Harrison, Ohio

== See also ==
- Bennett (disambiguation)
