= Bennett–McBride House =

Historic house in Minnesota, United States

- Bennett-McBride House
- U.S. National Register of Historic Places
- U.S. Historic district – Contributing property
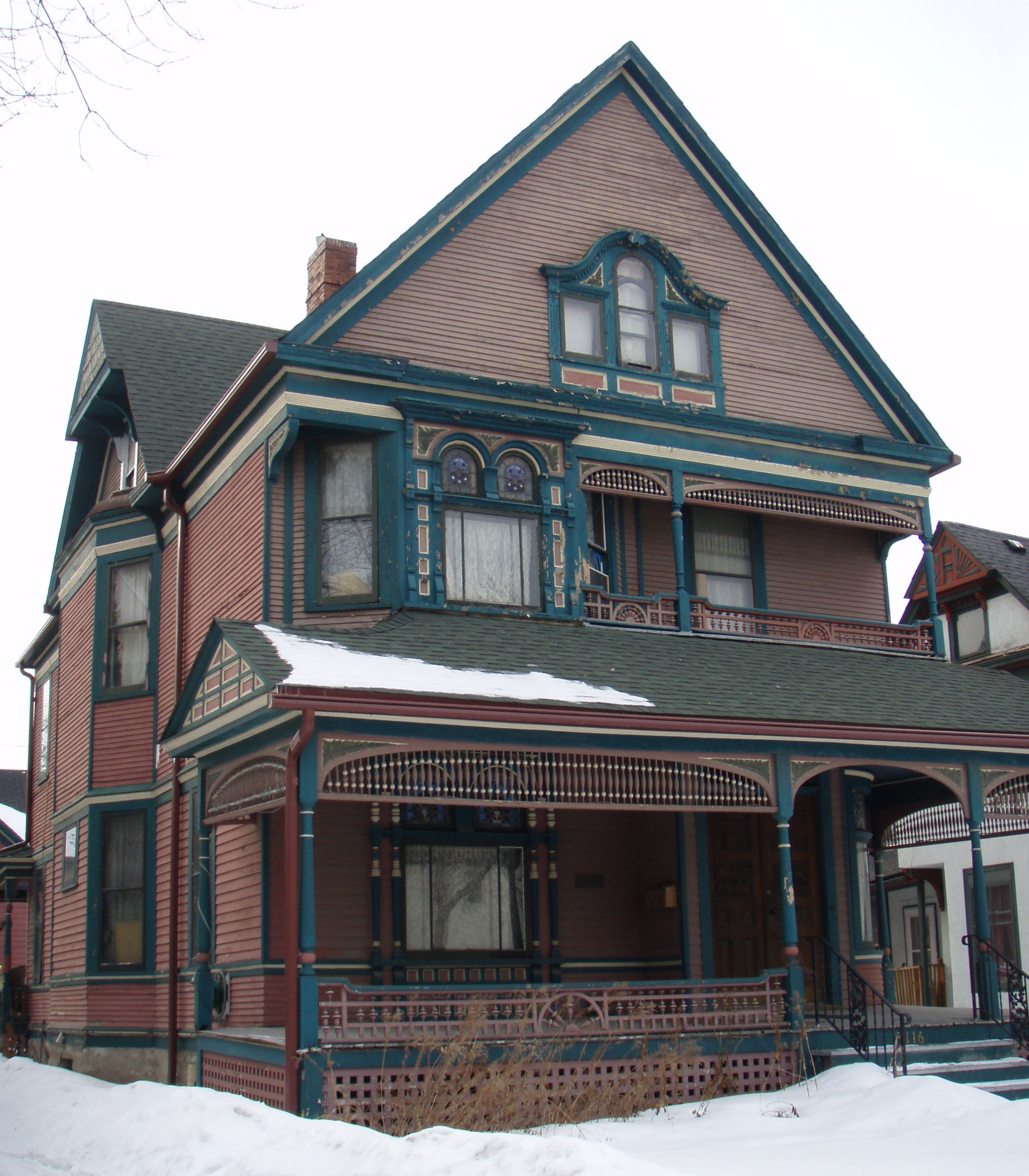
- The Bennett-McBride House from the southeast

- Location within Minnesota Location within the United States
- Location: 3116 3rd Ave. S. Minneapolis, Minnesota
- Coordinates: 44°56′44.9″N 93°16′23.3″W
- Area: Less than one acre
- Built: 1891
- Architect: Theron P. Healy
- Architectural style: Queen Anne
- Part of: Healy Block Residential Historic District (ID93000417)
- NRHP reference No.: 77000737
- Added to NRHP: September 19, 1977

The Bennett–McBride House is a house in the Central neighborhood of Minneapolis, Minnesota, United States. It is listed on the National Register of Historic Places and is a contributing property to the Healy Block Residential Historic District. This house was listed on the National Register in 1977, before the rest of the block was listed in 1993.

== History ==
Theron P. Healy moved to the city of Minneapolis in 1884 and decided to capitalize on the need for housing in the fast-growing city. Queen Anne style architecture in the United States was rapidly becoming popular after the Centennial Exposition in Philadelphia in 1876. The Bennett-McBride house was built in 1891 for local lumberman H.H. Bennett. While the exterior is similar to most of the Queen Anne houses on the block, the interior has some distinguishing features, particularly in its woodwork. The dining room features quarter-sawn oak, and the lacy fretwork has been well preserved, both on the inside and outside.

The house was selected in the Goodwill Industries Designer Showcase Home in 1976, as a local part of the American Bicentennial celebration. In 1977 it was listed on the National Register of Historic Places for local significance in architecture as one of Minneapolis's leading examples of Queen Anne-style residences. Its recognition spurred research into other homes on the block. City of Minneapolis Designation:

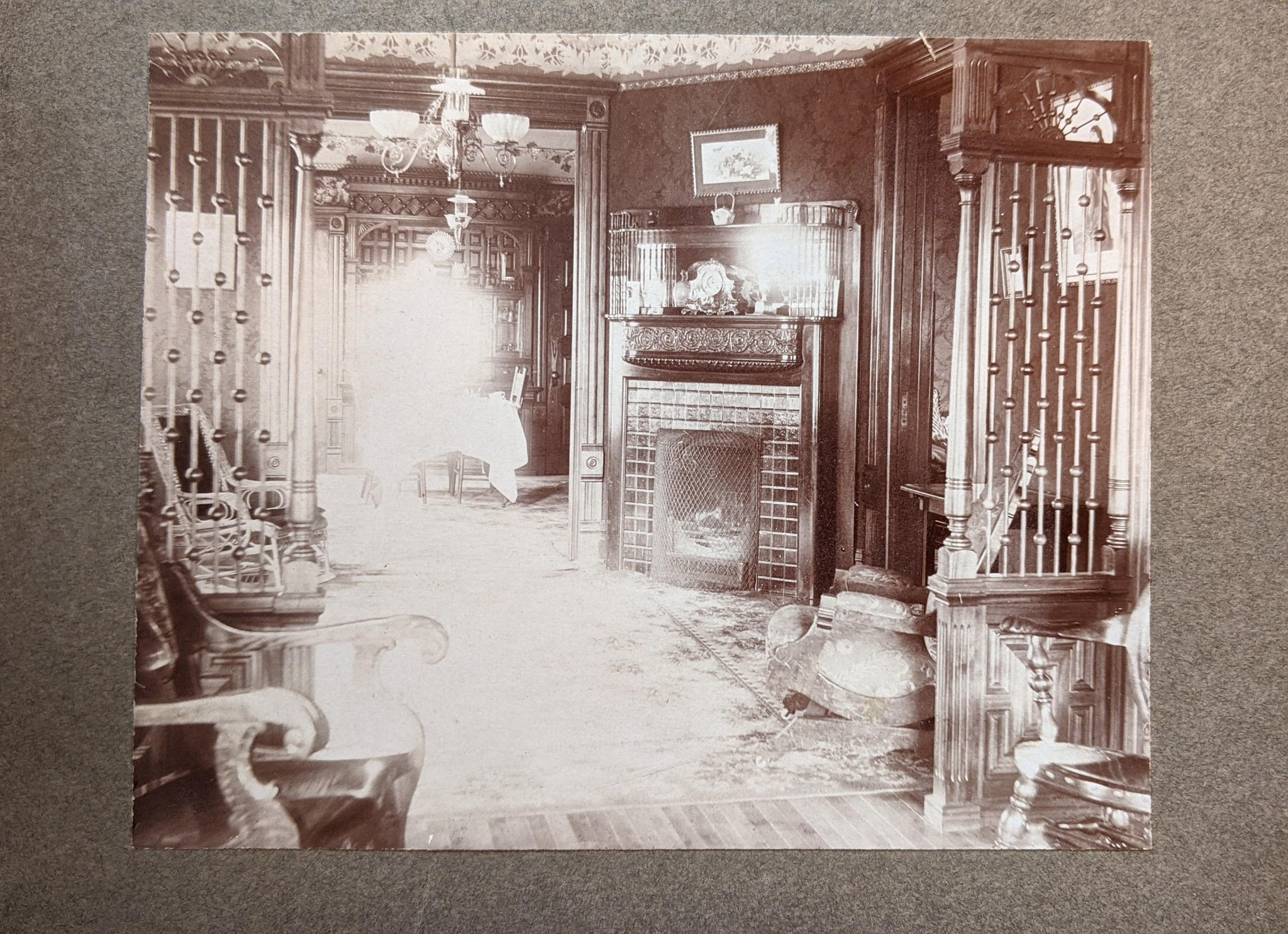
View from front parlor into rear parlor and dining room.

== See also ==
- National Register of Historic Places listings in Hennepin County, Minnesota
