= George Bennet (hebraist) =

Scottish presbyterian minister and Hebraist

- Born: c. 1750; Dysart, Fife, Scotland, United Kingdom
- Died: 20 October 1835
- Education: University of St Andrews
- Occupations: Presbyterian minister Theologian and Hebraist
- Spouse: Ann Hutton (d. 1834)
- Children: 6

George Bennet (c. 1750 – 20 October 1835), originally from Scotland, served as a presbyterian minister at the Annetwell Street Protestant meeting house at Carlisle in the far north-west of England between 1791 and 1807. He was the last presbyterian minister at Annetwell Street, his successors being from England and identified as "Independents" or, as the nineteenth century wore on, "Congregationalists". Beyond Carlisle he became noteworthy as an eminent theologian and as a Hebrew scholar.

== Life ==
George Bennet was born at Dysart, a trading port across the Firth of Forth from Edinburgh. Sources give his birth year variously as 1750 or 1751 (or, less plausibly, 1760). He received his university education at the University of St Andrews, and was licensed by the presbytery at Dunkeld on 3 September 1782. He was ordained as minister of Lady Glenorchy's Chapel in Annetwell Street at Carlisle on 1 June 1791.

In 1800, Bennet established a school at Fisher Street in Carlisle, advertising a wide curriculum that incorporated English (grammar and composition), Arithmetic, Book-keeping, Geography, Greek and Latin. Another source states that during his time in Carlisle he "passed a great portion of his life" studying Hebrew, becoming deeply familiar with rabbinical scholarship which, he believed, was sometimes better able than Christian sources to "catch the rays of light" emanating from the Bible. He was also a prodigious letter writer, engaging in scholarly exchanges with contemporary theologians including Isaac Milner, the eccentric and endlessly curious Dean of Carlisle and his brother, the church historian Joseph Milner. Other correspondents included Archdeacon William Paley, Archdeacon Robert Markham, Archdeacon Robert Nares, Bishop Beilby Porteus and Bishop Samuel Horsley. The scholarly content of Bennet's letters must have been substantive, since the analyses and critiques that he expressed found their way across the Atlantic, and in 1802 George Bennet was the recipient of an honorary Doctorate of Divinity from Harvard College in Massachusetts.

Copious letter writing may or may not have kept Bennet from his pastoral duties at the Annetwell Street chapel. Sources are not entirely consistent on the point. One (anonymous) source asserts that he was "in the truest sense a pastor among his flock: the business of ministry was his pleasure and delight . . . His sermons were conceived in a simple mould, and expressed with characteristic plainness of language". Less sympathetic was the commentator who opined that "had his spirituality of character borne any proportion to his literary attainments, his ministry might have been extensively successful; but the chapel became almost deserted, and the things which remained were indeed ready to die". Baptismal records indicate at least ten baptisms for every year between 1805 and 1809 which is not consistent with the idea of a congregation deserting in droves. On the other hand, when his successor took over in 1809, only ten names were listed on the congregational membership roll. Then again, by 1807, Bennet had been gone for two years, and it is not unreasonable to expect a two-year interregnum to coincide with a decline in congregation size.

Politics across Europe during the 1790s were dominated by the unfolding French Revolution and its aftermath. An insight into Bennet's political stance comes from the lengthy but expressive title of a book he wrote and had published in 1796: "A Display of the Spirit and Designs of those who, under pretence of a Reform, aim at the Subversion of the Constitution and Government of this Kingdom. With a Defence of Ecclesiastical Establishments". Another substantial book, published at Carlisle in 1800, was entitled, "Olam Hanashamoth, or a View of the Intermediate State as it appears in the Records of the Old and New Testaments".

Living in England at a time of heightened nationalism, Bennet came under pressure from friends to switch his ecclesiastical allegiance to Anglicanism, but he preferred to spend his final decades back in Scotland. His friend Archdeacon Robert Markham had a brother-in-law who was the Earl of Mansfield with an inheritance that included the right to appoint the Minister in charge at the parish of Strathmiglo near Auchtermuchty: Bennet was inducted to the living at Strathmiglo on 24 September 1807.

== Personal ==
George Bennet married Ann Hutton on 26 October 1791. The marriage produced six or seven recorded children. Six of the children were still alive in 1832.
