= Lord-Baylies-Bennett House =

Historic house in Massachusetts, United States

- Lord-Baylies House
- U.S. National Register of Historic Places
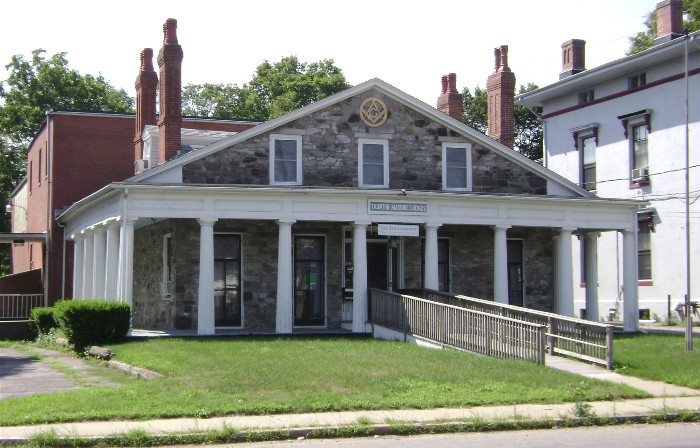

- Location within Massachusetts Location within the United States
- Location: 66 Winthrop St., Taunton, Massachusetts
- Coordinates: 41°53′52″N 71°5′50″W
- Built: 1831
- Architectural style: Greek Revival
- MPS: Taunton MRA
- NRHP reference No.: 84002165
- Added to NRHP: July 5, 1984

The Lord-Baylies-Bennett House is a historic house located at 66 Winthrop Street in Taunton, Massachusetts.

== Description and history ==
The house was built in 1831 for Joseph L. Lord, Postmaster of Taunton. The 1 1/2-story house, with its wide front gable and portico and fieldstone construction, is a unique form of Greek Revival architecture. The low-pitched gable roof is broken by four, very tall paneled brick chimneys with paired caps.

The house was sold to Francis Baylies in 1836. Baylies was an author, lawyer, judge and foreign diplomat. In 1959, the property was sold to the King David Masonic Lodge, who added a large modern brick addition off the rear of the main house.

It was added to the National Register of Historic Places on July 5, 1984. It is next door to the Samuel Washburn House.

== See also ==
- National Register of Historic Places listings in Taunton, Massachusetts
