= Bennett Building =

Bennett Building may refer to:

- Bennett Building (Council Bluffs, Iowa)
- Bennett Building (New York City)

== See also ==
- Bennett House (disambiguation)
- Sue Bennett Memorial School Building, a National Register of Historic Places listing in Laurel County, Kentucky
