= List of listed buildings in Kirkcaldy, Fife =

This is a list of listed buildings in the parish of Kirkcaldy in Fife, Scotland.

== List ==
Name	Location	Date listed	Grid ref. (Note: Sometimes known as OSGB36, the grid reference (where provided) is based on the British national grid reference system used by the Ordnance Survey. • "Guide to National Grid". Ordnance Survey. • "Get-a-map". Ordnance Survey.)	Geo-coordinates	Notes	LB number (Note: Historic Environment Scotland assign a unique alphanumeric identifier to each designated site in Scotland, for listed buildings this always begins with "LB", for example "LB12345".)	Image
Loughborough Road, Cemetery Lodge With Boundary Walls				56°07′38″N 3°07′38″W	Category C(S)	45535	Upload Photo
Pathhead Court, Pathhead Evangelical Union Congregational Church And Church Hall With Boundary Walls				56°07′13″N 3°08′58″W	Category C(S)	45543	Upload Photo
Ravenscraig Park Boundary Walls, Railings And Gates				56°07′15″N 3°08′22″W	Category B	45545	Upload Photo
2-6 (Even Nos) St Clair Street, 1 Dysart Road And Sinclair Tavern				56°07′16″N 3°08′30″W	Category C(S)	45549	Upload Photo
250 St Clair Street, The Fife Arms				56°07′42″N 3°08′14″W	Category C(S)	45551	Upload Photo
32 And 34 St Mary's Road With Boundary Walls				56°07′02″N 3°09′14″W	Category C(S)	45554	Upload Photo
Viewforth Street, Viewforth Day Centre With Boundary Walls And Gatepiers				56°07′37″N 3°08′04″W	Category C(S)	45563	Upload Photo
Abbotshall Road, Abbotshall Parish Church Graveyard With Mort-House, Boundary Walls, Gatepiers And Gates				56°06′35″N 3°10′06″W	Category B	45481	Upload Photo
Abbotshall Road, Abbotshall Parish Church Hall And Beadle's House				56°06′33″N 3°10′10″W	Category C(S)	45482	Upload Photo
Anderson Street, Pathhead Baptist Church With Hall And Boundary Walls				56°07′25″N 3°08′26″W	Category C(S)	45485	Upload Photo
Beveridge Park, Southerton Lodge				56°06′27″N 3°10′39″W	Category B	45495	Upload Photo
17-23 (Odd Nos) Church Street With Boundary Walls				56°07′23″N 3°08′27″W	Category C(S)	45497	Upload Photo
Den Road, Forbo-Nairn Ltd				56°07′21″N 3°09′00″W	Category B	45499	Upload another image See more images
Dysart, 2-14 (Even Nos) Fitzroy Street And High Street				56°07′31″N 3°07′21″W	Category C(S)	45505	Upload Photo
Dysart, 41-55 (Odd Nos) Normand Road, Berwick Place And 34-46 (Even Nos) Alexander Street				56°07′46″N 3°07′20″W	Category C(S)	45509	Upload Photo
Dysart, Townhead, Royal Hotel				56°07′36″N 3°07′27″W	Category C(S)	45513	Upload Photo
Dysart, 8, 10 And 12 Victoria Street				56°07′33″N 3°07′15″W	Category C(S)	45514	Upload Photo
Dysart, Westport And Townhead, War Memorial With Boundary Walls				56°07′33″N 3°07′30″W	Category C(S)	45515	Upload Photo
71 And 73 Loughborough Road				56°07′32″N 3°08′08″W	Category C(S)	45532	Upload Photo
475-479 (Odd Nos) High Street And Cottage To Rear With Boundary Walls				56°06′59″N 3°09′08″W	Category C(S)	44049	Upload Photo
212-216 (Even Nos) High Street				56°06′42″N 3°09′26″W	Category C(S)	44062	Upload Photo
69-81 (Odd Nos) Milton Road And Munro Street With Boundary Walls				56°06′16″N 3°09′59″W	Category B	44073	Upload Photo
Ramsay Road, Abbotshall Infant School With Boundary Walls, Gatepiers, Gates, Railings And Drinking Fountain				56°06′04″N 3°09′54″W	Category C(S)	44090	Upload Photo
12 And 14 Wemyssfield With Boundary Walls And Gatepiers				56°06′40″N 3°09′48″W	Category C(S)	44106	Upload Photo
23 Whytehouse Avenue With Greenhouse And Boundary Walls				56°06′30″N 3°09′49″W	Category C(S)	44109	Upload Photo
1 East Fergus Place And South Fergus Place With Gazebo And Boundary Walls And Railings				56°06′34″N 3°09′50″W	Category B	44007	Upload Photo
67-87 (Odd Nos) High Street And 1-9 (Odd Nos) Whytecauseway, Whytehouse Mansions				56°06′31″N 3°09′37″W	Category B	44013	Upload Photo
4-18 (Even Nos) Doctor's Row Off Rosslyn Street				56°08′01″N 3°07′58″W	Category C(S)	43892	Upload another image
38 Townsend Place With Boundary Walls				56°06′50″N 3°09′28″W	Category C(S)	36365	Upload Photo
22 Raith Gardens				56°06′35″N 3°10′31″W	Category C(S)	36394	Upload Photo
Pathhead, 6 The Path, Offices Of East Bridge Flour Mills With Former Horsemill, Boundary Walls, Railings And East Burn Bridge				56°07′06″N 3°09′03″W	Category B	36398	Upload Photo
Dysart, West Port, St Serf's Church Of Scotland With Boundary Walls, Gatepiers, Gates And Railings				56°07′32″N 3°07′30″W	Category B	36427	Upload Photo
Dysart, 10 West Port And 2 Townhead				56°07′34″N 3°07′30″W	Category C(S)	36430	Upload Photo
40 Kirk Wynd, Hendry Hall				56°06′44″N 3°09′31″W	Category B	36320	Upload Photo
51-59 (Odd Nos) High Street				56°06′28″N 3°09′38″W	Category C(S)	36326	Upload Photo
111-115 (Odd Nos) High Street				56°06′35″N 3°09′35″W	Category C(S)	36327	Upload Photo
148, 150, 154 And 156 High Street, Commercial Bank Buildings				56°06′38″N 3°09′31″W	Category B	36333	Upload Photo
160-164 (Even Nos) High Street, Central Chambers				56°06′38″N 3°09′30″W	Category B	36337	Upload Photo
201-205 (Odd Nos) High Street				56°06′41″N 3°09′30″W	Category C(S)	36340	Upload Photo
443-449 (Odd Nos) High Street And Malcolm's Wynd, Sailor's Walk With Boundary Walls				56°06′57″N 3°09′08″W	Category A	36358	Upload another image See more images
Nether Street, Sinclairtown Feuars Graveyard Including Boundary Walls				56°07′13″N 3°08′35″W	Category C(S)	45542	Upload Photo
108 St Clair Street And 1-3 (Odd Nos) Loughborough Road With Boundary Walls				56°07′29″N 3°08′27″W	Category B	45550	Upload Photo
Victoria Road, Victoria Power Station				56°07′09″N 3°09′20″W	Category B	45560	Upload Photo
56 And 58 Windmill Road With Boundary Walls				56°07′44″N 3°07′39″W	Category C(S)	45565	Upload Photo
5 Balwearie Road And 1 Balwearie Crescent				56°06′11″N 3°10′10″W	Category C(S)	45488	Upload Photo
69 And 71 Balwearie Road With Boundary Walls				56°06′05″N 3°10′33″W	Category C(S)	45489	Upload Photo
41-49 (Odd Nos) Church Street				56°07′24″N 3°08′24″W	Category C(S)	45498	Upload Photo
Dysart, 11 And 13 Fitzroy Square				56°07′31″N 3°07′22″W	Category C(S)	45504	Upload Photo
Dysart, Normand Road, Dysart Primary School With Boundary Walls, Gatepiers, Gates And Railings				56°07′45″N 3°07′18″W	Category C(S)	45510	Upload Photo
Dysart, Normand Road United Free Church With Boundary Walls, Gatepiers, Gates And Railings				56°07′42″N 3°07′23″W	Category C(S)	45512	Upload Photo
Dysart, West Quality Street, Masonic Hall				56°07′31″N 3°07′25″W	Category C(S)	45516	Upload Photo
Glebe Park And Maryhall Street, School House With Boundary Walls				56°06′59″N 3°09′26″W	Category C(S)	45527	Upload Photo
409-417 (Odd Nos) High Street				56°06′54″N 3°09′12″W	Category C(S)	44043	Upload Photo
252-262 (Even Nos) High Street And Redburn Wynd Mgm Cinema				56°06′44″N 3°09′21″W	Category B	44063	Upload Photo
Bennochy Road And St Brycedale Avenue, Adam Smith Theatre With Boundary Walls And Outbuilding				56°06′43″N 3°09′50″W	Category B	44003	Upload Photo
1 Beveridge Road, The Bungalow With Boundary Walls				56°06′33″N 3°09′59″W	Category C(S)	44004	Upload Photo
47 Townsend Place With Boundary Walls				56°06′52″N 3°09′25″W	Category C(S)	36369	Upload Photo
7-15 (Odd Nos) Mitchell Street With Boundary Walls				56°06′53″N 3°09′22″W	Category C(S)	36370	Upload Photo
2 East Fergus Place With Boundary Walls And Gates				56°06′36″N 3°09′49″W	Category B	36376	Upload Photo
Forth Park Drive, Bennochy House (Polish Ex-Servicemen's Club), With Outbuildings, Boundary Walls, Gatepiers And Gates				56°07′09″N 3°10′20″W	Category C(S)	36384	Upload Photo
54 Bennochy Road, Westdean Including Garden Enclosing Walls, Gatepiers And Gates				56°07′05″N 3°10′30″W	Category B	36385	Upload Photo
44 Nicol Street With Boundary Walls				56°06′24″N 3°09′52″W	Category B	36389	Upload Photo
Abbotshall Road, Abbotshall Parish Church (Church Of Scotland)				56°06′34″N 3°10′09″W	Category B	36391	Upload another image See more images
Nether Street, Pathhead Medical Centre, Path House With Gatepiers And Boundary Wall				56°07′10″N 3°08′52″W	Category A	36399	Upload another image See more images
Commercial Street And Bogies Wynd, Feuars Arms				56°07′15″N 3°08′46″W	Category A	36401	Upload Photo
Dysart, 7 Pan Ha', The Girnel With Boundary Walls				56°07′27″N 3°07′16″W	Category B	36409	Upload Photo
Dysart, 8 Pan Ha', The Covenant House				56°07′27″N 3°07′15″W	Category B	36410	Upload Photo
Dysart, 10 Pan Ha', The Pilot's House With Boundary Walls				56°07′27″N 3°07′14″W	Category B	36412	Upload Photo
Dysart, 44 East Quality Street With Former Coach House				56°07′36″N 3°07′21″W	Category B	36437	Upload Photo
Victoria Road, Victoria Viaduct				56°07′12″N 3°09′07″W	Category B	36446	Upload Photo
Hunter Street, Telephone Kiosk At Former Post Office				56°06′38″N 3°09′42″W	Category B	36447	Upload Photo
130 St Clair Street				56°07′31″N 3°08′27″W	Category B	36449	Upload Photo
Kirk Wynd, Kirkcaldy Old Kirk (Former Kirkcaldy Parish Church), Including Graveyard Boundary Wall And Steps				56°06′45″N 3°09′31″W	Category B	36317	Upload Photo
34 And 36 Kirk Wynd With Boundary Walls				56°06′44″N 3°09′30″W	Category B	36321	Upload Photo
6 Kirk Wynd, Tsb Bank				56°06′43″N 3°09′29″W	Category B	36322	Upload Photo
170 High Street And Tolbooth Street				56°06′39″N 3°09′29″W	Category B	36334	Upload Photo
191 High Street				56°06′41″N 3°09′30″W	Category B	36338	Upload Photo
263-271 (Odd Nos) High Street And 6 Oswald's Wynd				56°06′45″N 3°09′23″W	Category B	36347	Upload Photo
275 And 277 High Street				56°06′46″N 3°09′23″W	Category B	36348	Upload Photo
305A-315 (Odd Nos) High Street With Oven, Elder's Brae				56°06′47″N 3°09′18″W	Category B	36349	Upload Photo
295A And 297 High Street And Victoria House With Pottie's Close Outbuilding And Boundary Walls				56°06′47″N 3°09′20″W	Category B	36350	Upload Photo
333-337 (Odd Nos) High Street With Boundary Walls				56°06′49″N 3°09′17″W	Category B	36353	Upload Photo
439 High Street				56°06′56″N 3°09′10″W	Category B	36357	Upload Photo
2 Townsend Place And Kirk Wynd				56°06′46″N 3°09′35″W	Category B	36361	Upload Photo
Loughborough Road, Sinclairtown Library And Clinic				56°07′30″N 3°08′09″W	Category C(S)	45536	Upload another image
Loughborough Road, Viewforth High School Annexe With Former Stable And Washhouse, Boundary Walls, Gatepiers And Terraces				56°07′31″N 3°08′05″W	Category B	45538	Upload Photo
St Clair Street, Methodist Church				56°07′30″N 3°08′30″W	Category C(S)	45553	Upload Photo
Thornton Road, National Tyres				56°08′58″N 3°08′25″W	Category C(S)	45555	Upload Photo
121 Victoria Road, Victoria House With Boundary Walls, Gatepiers And Gates				56°06′59″N 3°09′37″W	Category C(S)	45557	Upload Photo
Victoria Road And Victoria Gardens, St Andrews Church (Church Of Scotland)				56°06′54″N 3°09′46″W	Category B	45562	Upload Photo
Bennochy Road, Forth Park Hospital Including Former Coach House, Stables, Cottage And Boundary Walls				56°07′04″N 3°10′12″W	Category B	45491	Upload Photo
Bennochy Road And Balsusney Road, Bennochy Cemetery Including Lodge, Gravestones, Boundary Walls, Gatepiers And Gates				56°06′53″N 3°09′56″W	Category C(S)	45492	Upload Photo
Dunnikier Way, Fife Council, Dunnikier House Policies, Former Walled Garden And Gatepiers				56°08′10″N 3°09′34″W	Category C(S)	45502	Upload Photo
Dysart, Hot Pot Wynd, Harbour House				56°07′24″N 3°07′27″W	Category B	45507	Upload Photo
78 Lady Nairn Avenue				56°07′27″N 3°07′53″W	Category C(S)	45530	Upload Photo
317 And 319 High Street				56°06′48″N 3°09′18″W	Category C(S)	44448	Upload Photo
405 And 407 High Street				56°06′54″N 3°09′12″W	Category C(S)	44042	Upload Photo
429 High Street, Harbour House, With Boundary Walls And Railings				56°06′56″N 3°09′12″W	Category B	44044	Upload Photo
465 And 467 High Street And Malcolm's House With Boundary Walls				56°06′58″N 3°09′07″W	Category C(S)	44047	Upload Photo
176 High Street And Tolbooth Street				56°06′40″N 3°09′29″W	Category C(S)	44057	Upload Photo
192-196 (Even Nos) High Street				56°06′40″N 3°09′27″W	Category B	44061	Upload Photo
High Street, Wemyss Buildings				56°06′24″N 3°09′39″W	Category C(S)	44065	Upload Photo
High Street And Whytehouse Avenue, West End Congregational Church				56°06′29″N 3°09′38″W	Category B	44066	Upload Photo
85 And 87 Milton Road, Maryfield, With Boundary Walls, Gatepiers And Lamp Bracket				56°06′15″N 3°10′02″W	Category B	44079	Upload Photo
32-38 (Even Nos) Milton Road With Boundary Walls				56°06′18″N 3°09′45″W	Category C(S)	44080	Upload Photo
42 Milton Road, West Primary School With Outbuildings, Gatepiers, Boundary Walls And Lamp Bracket				56°06′16″N 3°09′48″W	Category B	44081	Upload Photo
13 Charlotte St				56°06′30″N 3°09′31″W	Category B	44095	Upload Photo
50 Townsend Place With Boundary Walls And Railings				56°06′50″N 3°09′24″W	Category C(S)	44103	Upload Photo
Bennochy Road, Kirkcaldy Museum, Art Gallery And Public Library With Pavilion				56°06′45″N 3°09′58″W	Category B	44000	Upload Photo
Bennochy Road, Museum Lodge				56°06′45″N 3°09′58″W	Category C(S)	44001	Upload Photo
7 East Fergus Place, Fergus House With Boundary Walls				56°06′36″N 3°09′54″W	Category C(S)	44009	Upload Photo
26 East Fergus Place With Boundary Walls				56°06′38″N 3°09′56″W	Category C(S)	44011	Upload Photo
89-95 (Odd Nos) High Street And 2 Whytecauseway, Burton's				56°06′33″N 3°09′36″W	Category B	44014	Upload Photo
117-121 (Odd Nos) High Street				56°06′35″N 3°09′35″W	Category C(S)	44015	Upload Photo
123-127 (Odd Nos) High Street And Hill Street				56°06′36″N 3°09′35″W	Category C(S)	44016	Upload Photo
St Brycedale Avenue And Kirk Wynd, St Brycedale's Church And Church Hall With Boundary Walls, Gatepiers And Gates				56°06′45″N 3°09′38″W	Category B	36373	Upload Photo
Dysart, Carmelite Monastery, Former Dysart House, With St Serf's Cave, Terraced Garden And Boundary Walls				56°07′28″N 3°07′26″W	Category B	36416	Upload Photo
Dysart, 58 And 60 High Street				56°07′34″N 3°07′15″W	Category B	36420	Upload Photo
Dysart, 14 Fitzroy Square, St David's With Outbuilding And Boundary Walls				56°07′31″N 3°07′22″W	Category A	36425	Upload Photo
Dysart, 69 East Quality Street				56°07′38″N 3°07′21″W	Category B	36440	Upload Photo
Dunnikier Way, Dunnikier House Hotel				56°08′10″N 3°09′44″W	Category B	36442	Upload Photo
Kirk Wynd, Kirkcaldy Parish Church, Churchyard With Boundary Walls, Gatepiers, Gates And Steps				56°06′46″N 3°09′31″W	Category B	36319	Upload Photo
37 Kirk Wynd With Boundary Walls				56°06′44″N 3°09′35″W	Category B	36323	Upload Photo
44-50 (Even Nos) High Street				56°06′29″N 3°09′35″W	Category C(S)	36325	Upload Photo
158 High Street				56°06′38″N 3°09′29″W	Category C(S)	36336	Upload Photo
427 And 431 High Street				56°06′55″N 3°09′11″W	Category C(S)	36356	Upload Photo
9 And 11 Townsend Place With Boundary Walls				56°06′48″N 3°09′36″W	Category B	36362	Upload Photo
1-3 Mitchell Street				56°06′52″N 3°09′23″W	Category C(S)	45540	Upload Photo
254 St Clair Street				56°07′43″N 3°08′13″W	Category C(S)	45552	Upload Photo
6 And 8 Anderson Street				56°07′24″N 3°08′25″W	Category C(S)	45483	Upload Photo
187 Balsusney Road				56°06′57″N 3°09′51″W	Category C(S)	45486	Upload Photo
Beveridge Park, Main Gate And South East Gate				56°06′27″N 3°10′16″W	Category B	45493	Upload Photo
133 Dunnikier Road, Victoria House, Fife Council Property & Development Services, Including Boundary Walls				56°07′16″N 3°09′40″W	Category C(S)	45500	Upload Photo
21 Glebe Park With Boundary Walls And Gatepiers				56°06′59″N 3°09′25″W	Category C(S)	45524	Upload Photo
High Street, Olympia Arcade Halls West, To Rear Of Wemyss Buildings (Former Abbotshall Linen Works)				56°06′24″N 3°09′40″W	Category C(S)	44446	Upload Photo
7 Nicol Street With Boundary Walls				56°06′24″N 3°09′45″W	Category C(S)	44085	Upload Photo
St Brycedale Avenue, Fife College, St Brycedale Campus With Boundary Walls And Railings				56°06′46″N 3°09′44″W	Category B	44092	Upload Photo
1 South Fergus Place And West Fergus Place With Gatepiers And Boundary Walls				56°06′31″N 3°09′54″W	Category C(S)	44093	Upload Photo
21 Tolbooth Street				56°06′38″N 3°09′25″W	Category C(S)	44098	Upload Photo
35-41 (Odd Nos) Townsend Place With Boundary Walls				56°06′51″N 3°09′27″W	Category C(S)	44099	Upload Photo
49 And 51 Townsend Place				56°06′52″N 3°09′24″W	Category C(S)	44101	Upload Photo
Whytecauseway, Sheriff Court Buildings With Boundary Walls				56°06′34″N 3°09′48″W	Category B	44108	Upload another image See more images
18 And 20 Beveridge Road With Boundary Walls				56°06′32″N 3°10′02″W	Category C(S)	44005	Upload Photo
9 East Fergus Place, The Cedars, With Boundary Walls				56°06′36″N 3°09′55″W	Category C(S)	44010	Upload Photo
36 Townsend Place With Boundary Walls				56°06′49″N 3°09′28″W	Category C(S)	36364	Upload Photo
17 Tolbooth Street				56°06′39″N 3°09′26″W	Category B	36371	Upload Photo
16 Wemyssfield With Boundary Walls				56°06′41″N 3°09′49″W	Category B	36374	Upload Photo
Bethelfield Place And Nicol Street, Linktown Church (Church Of Scotland) And Hall With Boundary Walls And Gatepiers				56°06′24″N 3°09′43″W	Category B	36388	Upload Photo
Dysart Harbour				56°07′22″N 3°07′28″W	Category B	36406	Upload another image
Dysart, 9 Pan Ha', The Tide-Waiter's House With Boundary Walls				56°07′27″N 3°07′15″W	Category B	36411	Upload Photo
Dysart, 40 And 42 High Street With Boundary Walls				56°07′32″N 3°07′17″W	Category B	36417	Upload Photo
Dysart, High Street And Victoria Street, Tolbooth And Town Hall				56°07′34″N 3°07′16″W	Category A	36418	Upload another image See more images
Dysart, Rectory Lane And West Quality Street, Old Rectory Inn With Boundary Walls, Gatepiers And Gates				56°07′31″N 3°07′25″W	Category B	36426	Upload Photo
Dysart, Townhead, Dysart Barony, With Graveyard And Boundary Walls				56°07′38″N 3°07′27″W	Category B	36431	Upload Photo
Windmill Road, Old Windmill Tower				56°07′42″N 3°07′42″W	Category B	36441	Upload Photo
133 And 135 High Street With Boundary Walls				56°06′36″N 3°09′34″W	Category B	36330	Upload Photo
211-217 (Odd Nos) High Street				56°06′42″N 3°09′29″W	Category B	36341	Upload Photo
339-343 (Odd Nos) High Street With Boundary Walls				56°06′49″N 3°09′16″W	Category A	36354	Upload another image
Mid Street, Pathhead Feuars' Graveyard With Boundary Walls, Gatepiers And Gates				56°07′12″N 3°08′59″W	Category B	45539	Upload Photo
Rosslyn Street, Gallatown Nursery School With Boundary Walls Gatepiers And Railings				56°07′54″N 3°08′02″W	Category C(S)	45547	Upload Photo
Viceroy Street, J Thomson & Son				56°07′10″N 3°10′00″W	Category C(S)	45556	Upload Photo
Victoria Road And Dunnikier Road, Victoria Mansions				56°07′06″N 3°09′26″W	Category C(S)	45561	Upload Photo
Viewforth Street And Viewforth Terrace, Viewforth (Church Of Scotland) Church With Gatepiers And Boundary Walls				56°07′44″N 3°08′09″W	Category C(S)	45564	Upload another image
Dysart, High Street, The Cross Jubilee Lamp				56°07′34″N 3°07′16″W	Category C(S)	45506	Upload Photo
15 Dysart Road				56°07′15″N 3°08′27″W	Category C(S)	45517	Upload Photo
87 Loughborough Road With Boundary Walls And Railings				56°07′34″N 3°07′58″W	Category C(S)	45533	Upload Photo
461 And 463 High Street, The 'Lang Toun' Bar, And Malcolm's Wynd With Boundary Walls				56°06′57″N 3°09′08″W	Category B	44046	Upload Photo
High Street, Fife College, Priory Campus, Nairn Building With Boundary Walls				56°07′00″N 3°09′06″W	Category B	44050	Upload Photo
152 High Street, New Club With Boundary Walls				56°06′37″N 3°09′29″W	Category B	44055	Upload Photo
Kirkcaldy Dock And Harbour				56°06′53″N 3°09′02″W	Category B	44067	Upload Photo
Links Street, Former Raith Church With Boundary Walls And Cast-Iron Stanchion				56°06′15″N 3°09′39″W	Category C(S)	44072	Upload Photo
83 Milton Road, Forrester Memorial Manse With Boundary Walls				56°06′16″N 3°10′00″W	Category C(S)	44078	Upload Photo
191 Nicol Street With Boundary Walls				56°06′27″N 3°09′58″W	Category C(S)	44086	Upload Photo
15 Tolbooth Street				56°06′39″N 3°09′26″W	Category C(S)	44096	Upload Photo
48 Townsend Place With Boundary Walls				56°06′50″N 3°09′25″W	Category C(S)	44102	Upload Photo
6 Wemyssfield, Wemyssfield House With Boundary Walls				56°06′39″N 3°09′46″W	Category B	44105	Upload Photo
Bennochy Road And Abbotshall Road, War Memorial And Gardens With Sundial, Gatepiers And Quadrant Walls				56°06′43″N 3°09′57″W	Category B	44002	Upload another image See more images
131 High Street				56°06′36″N 3°09′34″W	Category C(S)	44017	Upload Photo
40 Townsend Place And 31 Oswalds Wynd				56°06′50″N 3°09′27″W	Category C(S)	36366	Upload Photo
52 Townsend Place With Boundary Walls And Railings				56°06′51″N 3°09′24″W	Category B	36367	Upload Photo
East Fergus Place, Osborne House With Boundary Walls And Gatepier				56°06′39″N 3°09′55″W	Category B	36378	Upload Photo
52 Bennochy Road, Sauchendene, With Boundary Walls And Gatepiers				56°07′04″N 3°10′26″W	Category B	36382	Upload Photo
Raith Walled Garden, Old Gate (Adjoining 2 Raith Gardens) And Boundary Walls				56°06′35″N 3°10′24″W	Category B	36393	Upload Photo
Church Street And Harriet Street, Pathhead Parish Church (Church Of Scotland) With Boundary Walls				56°07′21″N 3°08′29″W	Category B	36403	Upload Photo
Ravenscraig Park, Dovecot				56°07′12″N 3°08′18″W	Category A	36405	Upload Photo
Dysart, 11 Pan Ha', The Shoremaster's House				56°07′28″N 3°07′14″W	Category B	36413	Upload Photo
Dysart, 54 And 56 High Street				56°07′34″N 3°07′15″W	Category B	36419	Upload Photo
137-141 (Odd Nos) High Street				56°06′37″N 3°09′33″W	Category C(S)	36332	Upload Photo
395-399 (Odd Nos) High Street				56°06′53″N 3°09′13″W	Category B	36355	Upload Photo
Thornton Road, Kincraig				56°08′51″N 3°08′26″W	Category B	36360	Upload Photo
281 - 285 (Odd Nos) High Street				56°06′46″N 3°09′21″W	Category C(S)	48418	Upload Photo
5 Mitchell Street				56°06′52″N 3°09′23″W	Category C(S)	45541	Upload Photo
14 Boglily Road With Boundary Walls, Gatepiers And Gates				56°06′28″N 3°10′23″W	Category B	45496	Upload Photo
34 High Street				56°06′27″N 3°09′35″W	Category C(S)	44051	Upload Photo
132 High Street				56°06′36″N 3°09′31″W	Category B	44054	Upload Photo
286-290 (Even Nos) High Street				56°06′46″N 3°09′18″W	Category C(S)	44064	Upload Photo
44 Milton Road, Janitor's House				56°06′16″N 3°09′51″W	Category C(S)	44082	Upload Photo
15 Wemyssfield, Stairard With Boundary Walls And Gatepiers				56°06′39″N 3°09′51″W	Category B	44104	Upload Photo
Coal Wynd, Former Mission Institute/Tax Office With Gates, Gatepiers And Railings				56°06′52″N 3°09′18″W	Category C(S)	44006	Upload Photo
East Fergus Place, St Margaret's, With Boundary Walls				56°06′38″N 3°09′52″W	Category B	44012	Upload Photo
23 And 25 Tolbooth Street				56°06′38″N 3°09′24″W	Category B	36372	Upload Photo
31 Bennochy Road, Morningside Residential Home With Conservatory, Boundary Walls And Gatepiers				56°07′00″N 3°10′08″W	Category B	36380	Upload Photo
46 Nicol Street, Newton House With Boundary Walls And Gatepiers				56°06′24″N 3°09′53″W	Category B	36390	Upload Photo
Dysart, 1 And 2 Shore Road, The Anchorage With Boundary Walls				56°07′28″N 3°07′15″W	Category A	36414	Upload Photo
Dysart, Shore Road, St Serf's Kirk, Tower And Graveyard Including Boundary Walls				56°07′27″N 3°07′19″W	Category A	36415	Upload another image
Dysart, 5 Mcdouall Stuart Place With Boundary Walls				56°07′30″N 3°07′18″W	Category B	36423	Upload Photo
Dysart, 42 East Quality Street				56°07′36″N 3°07′21″W	Category B	36436	Upload Photo
151-153 (Odd Nos) High Street				56°06′38″N 3°09′33″W	Category B	36331	Upload Photo
193-199 (Odd Nos) High Street				56°06′41″N 3°09′30″W	Category B	36339	Upload Photo
221 High Street And Kirk Wynd, Swan Memorial Building				56°06′43″N 3°09′28″W	Category C(S)	36343	Upload Photo
228-232 High Street				56°06′43″N 3°09′25″W	Category C(S)	36346	Upload Photo
Ravenscraig Street, Craignairn House With Boundary Walls And Gatepiers				56°07′23″N 3°08′23″W	Category B	36359	Upload Photo
84 Loughborough Road, Ravensheugh With Gatepiers, Gates And Boundary Walls				56°07′33″N 3°07′52″W	Category B	45534	Upload Photo
Prime Gilt Box Street, North Primary School And Psychological Services, With Outbuilding, Boundary Walls And Railings				56°07′15″N 3°09′44″W	Category C(S)	45544	Upload Photo
Ravenscraig Park, Lookout Tower				56°07′08″N 3°08′10″W	Category B	45546	Upload Photo
Victoria Road, Victoria Hotel				56°07′01″N 3°09′37″W	Category B	45559	Upload Photo
Dunnikier Road And Victoria Road, St Marie's Roman Catholic Church With Boundary Walls				56°07′06″N 3°09′23″W	Category B	45501	Upload Photo
Dysart, Mcdouall Stuart Place And Rectory Lane, Mcdouall Stuart Museum With Boundary Walls				56°07′30″N 3°07′17″W	Category B	45508	Upload Photo
Glebe Park Centre, Former East School With Boundary Walls				56°07′00″N 3°09′27″W	Category B	45525	Upload Photo
Hayfield Road, West Lodge With Boundary Walls				56°07′34″N 3°09′44″W	Category C(S)	45528	Upload Photo
Lawson Street And Park Road, Hawklymuir Factory				56°07′50″N 3°08′16″W	Category C(S)	45531	Upload Photo
St Brycedale Road And St Brycedale Avenue, Police Buildings With Gatepiers And Boundary Walls				56°06′43″N 3°09′44″W	Category B	44447	Upload Photo
469-473 (Odd Nos) High Street, Harbour Bar And Outbuilding With Boundary Walls				56°06′58″N 3°09′07″W	Category C(S)	44048	Upload Photo
182 High Street				56°06′40″N 3°09′28″W	Category C(S)	44059	Upload Photo
74 And 76 Milton Road, West Holme And Fairview, With Boundary Walls And Gatepiers				56°06′14″N 3°10′01″W	Category B	44084	Upload Photo
20 The Esplanade				56°06′40″N 3°09′22″W	Category C(S)	44094	Upload Photo
19 Tolbooth Street				56°06′39″N 3°09′25″W	Category C(S)	44097	Upload Photo
43 And 45 Townsend Place With Boundary Walls				56°06′51″N 3°09′25″W	Category C(S)	44100	Upload Photo
30 Whytehouse Avenue With Boundary Walls, Gatepiers And Gates				56°06′32″N 3°09′47″W	Category C(S)	44110	Upload Photo
299-305 (Odd Nos) High Street				56°06′47″N 3°09′19″W	Category B	44019	Upload Photo
4 East Fergus Place With Balcony And Boundary Walls				56°06′36″N 3°09′50″W	Category B	36377	Upload Photo
Wemyssfield, Town House With Provost's Lamps And Boundary Walls				56°06′35″N 3°09′45″W	Category B	36387	Upload another image
Bridge Street, The Foyer, West Bridge Mill (Forth And Clyde Roperie)				56°05′54″N 3°09′53″W	Category B	36397	Upload Photo
Dysart, 1 Pan Ha', Bay House Including Boundary Walls, Gatepiers And Gates				56°07′26″N 3°07′20″W	Category A	36407	Upload Photo
Dysart, West Port, St Serf's Churchyard, Dovecot				56°07′32″N 3°07′31″W	Category B	36428	Upload Photo
Dysart, 49 East Quality Street				56°07′37″N 3°07′23″W	Category B	36435	Upload Photo
Dysart, 46 East Quality Street				56°07′37″N 3°07′21″W	Category B	36438	Upload Photo
Hayfield Road, Former Gateway To Dunnikier House With Gates				56°07′34″N 3°09′43″W	Category B	36443	Upload Photo
2 Wishart Place And Dysart Road, Strathearn Hotel With Boundary Walls And Gatepiers				56°07′26″N 3°07′52″W	Category B	36444	Upload Photo
Victoria Road, Braehead House With Terrace, Boundary Walls, Gatepiers, Gates And Railings				56°07′11″N 3°09′01″W	Category B	36445	Upload Photo
Whytecauseway, Telephone Kiosk At Townhouse				56°06′34″N 3°09′44″W	Category B	36448	Upload Photo
114 High Street Bank Of Scotland				56°06′35″N 3°09′32″W	Category B	36328	Upload Photo
180 High Street				56°06′40″N 3°09′28″W	Category C(S)	36335	Upload Photo
218-222 (Even Nos) High Street Adam Smith House				56°06′42″N 3°09′26″W	Category B	36344	Upload Photo
321 And 323 High Street				56°06′48″N 3°09′18″W	Category C(S)	36352	Upload Photo
5 Smeaton Road, Glenaber Engineers, Polychrome Buildings Including Boundary Walls				56°07′21″N 3°09′03″W	Category B	45548	Upload Photo
1 And 3 Balwearie Road				56°06′11″N 3°10′09″W	Category C(S)	45487	Upload Photo
24 Bennochy Road, Marchmont Residential Home With Boundary Walls				56°07′00″N 3°10′04″W	Category B	45490	Upload Photo
Beveridge Park Main Gate Lodge With Lions				56°06′26″N 3°10′17″W	Category B	45494	Upload Photo
Dysart, Normand Road, The Bird House Including Boundary Walls, Gatepiers, Gates And Railings				56°07′39″N 3°07′21″W	Category C(S)	45511	Upload Photo
42 High Street And 1 Glasswork Street, Kirkcaldy Peoples Club And Institute				56°06′28″N 3°09′34″W	Category C(S)	44052	Upload Photo
178 High Street				56°06′40″N 3°09′29″W	Category C(S)	44058	Upload Photo
184 High Street				56°06′40″N 3°09′28″W	Category C(S)	44060	Upload Photo
149 Links Street				56°07′37″N 3°08′04″W	Category C(S)	44070	Upload Photo
Links Street Clock				56°06′04″N 3°09′43″W	Category C(S)	44071	Upload Photo
72 Milton Road, Abbotsford, With Boundary Walls				56°06′14″N 3°09′59″W	Category C(S)	44083	Upload Photo
21 Pratt Street, Invertiel Guest House With Boundary Walls Gatepiers And Gates				56°05′59″N 3°10′00″W	Category C(S)	44089	Upload Photo
Ramsay Road, Abbotshall School Off-Campus Unit With Boundary Walls And Drinking Fountain				56°06′03″N 3°09′51″W	Category C(S)	44091	Upload Photo
Whytecauseway, Baptist Church				56°06′35″N 3°09′40″W	Category C(S)	44107	Upload Photo
3 East Fergus Place With Outbuilding And Boundary Walls				56°06′35″N 3°09′50″W	Category C(S)	44008	Upload Photo
287-295 (Odd Nos) High Street With Boundary Walls				56°06′46″N 3°09′21″W	Category C(S)	44018	Upload Photo
54 And 56 Townsend Place With Boundary Walls And Railings				56°06′51″N 3°09′23″W	Category B	36368	Upload Photo
Hunter Street, Hunter Hospital With John Hunter Memorial, Gazebo, Gatepiers And Boundary Walls				56°06′42″N 3°09′38″W	Category B	36375	Upload Photo
8 Bennochy Avenue				56°06′59″N 3°10′13″W	Category B	36379	Upload Photo
50 Bennochy Road Including Boundary Walls				56°07′04″N 3°10′25″W	Category B	36381	Upload Photo
26 Bennochy Road, Beechwood, Including Former Stables And Boundary Walls				56°07′00″N 3°10′05″W	Category B	36383	Upload Photo
Abbotshall Road, Raith Lodge And Gateway				56°06′29″N 3°10′16″W	Category B	36392	Upload Photo
40 Milton Road With Gatepiers, Gates And Boundary Walls				56°06′16″N 3°09′46″W	Category B	36395	Upload Photo
Linktown Railway Viaduct				56°05′54″N 3°10′09″W	Category B	36396	Upload Photo
Commercial Street, Pathhead Halls, Fife College Arts And Leisure Centre				56°07′18″N 3°08′38″W	Category B	36402	Upload another image See more images
Dysart, Pan Ha', The Salmon Fisher's House With Boundary Walls				56°07′27″N 3°07′17″W	Category B	36408	Upload Photo
Dysart, 1 And 3 Mcdouall Stuart Place With Boundary Walls				56°07′30″N 3°07′18″W	Category B	36422	Upload Photo
Dysart, West Port And Quality Street, Orchardcroft With Outbuilding, Boundary Walls, Gatepiers And Gates				56°07′34″N 3°07′25″W	Category B	36433	Upload Photo
Dysart, 43-47 East Quality Street, The Towers With Forecourt Wall				56°07′36″N 3°07′23″W	Category A	36434	Upload Photo
Dysart, 65 East Quality Street				56°07′37″N 3°07′22″W	Category B	36439	Upload Photo
29 St Clair Street				56°07′21″N 3°08′34″W	Category B	36451	Upload Photo
Hunter Street And Wemyssfield, Post Office Including Pedestrian Gateway, Gatepier And Boundary Walls				56°06′38″N 3°09′44″W	Category B	36452	Upload Photo
Dunnikier Road, Fire Station With Boundary Wall				56°07′00″N 3°09′16″W	Category B	36318	Upload Photo
36-40 (Even Nos) High Street				56°06′28″N 3°09′35″W	Category C(S)	36324	Upload Photo
224-226 (Even Nos) High Street With Boundary Walls				56°06′42″N 3°09′25″W	Category B	36345	Upload Photo
32 And 34 Townsend Place With Boundary Walls				56°06′49″N 3°09′29″W	Category C(S)	36363	Upload Photo
Balwearie High School, Balwearie Gardens, Kirkcaldy				56°06′02″N 3°10′20″W	Category B	52202	Upload Photo
Rosslyn Street, Fife Ice Arena Including Gate Piers and Quadrant Walls				56°07′58″N 3°08′03″W	Category B	52112	Upload another image
Phase II Block (Tower and Podium), Victoria Hospital, excluding all later additions and other buildings on the hospital site, except for the Phase I Block to the north (LB52536), Hayfield Road, Kirkcaldy				56°07′30″N 3°09′36″W	Category B	52537	Upload Photo

== Key ==
The scheme for classifying buildings in Scotland is:

- Category A: "buildings of national or international importance, either architectural or historic; or fine, little-altered examples of some particular period, style or building type."
- Category B: "buildings of regional or more than local importance; or major examples of some particular period, style or building type, which may have been altered."
- Category C: "buildings of local importance; lesser examples of any period, style, or building type, as originally constructed or moderately altered; and simple traditional buildings which group well with other listed buildings."

In March 2016 there were 47,288 listed buildings in Scotland. Of these, 8% were Category A, and 50% were Category B, with the remaining 42% being Category C.

== See also ==
- List of listed buildings in Fife
