= Dysart Tolbooth and Town House =

Municipal building in Dysart, Scotland

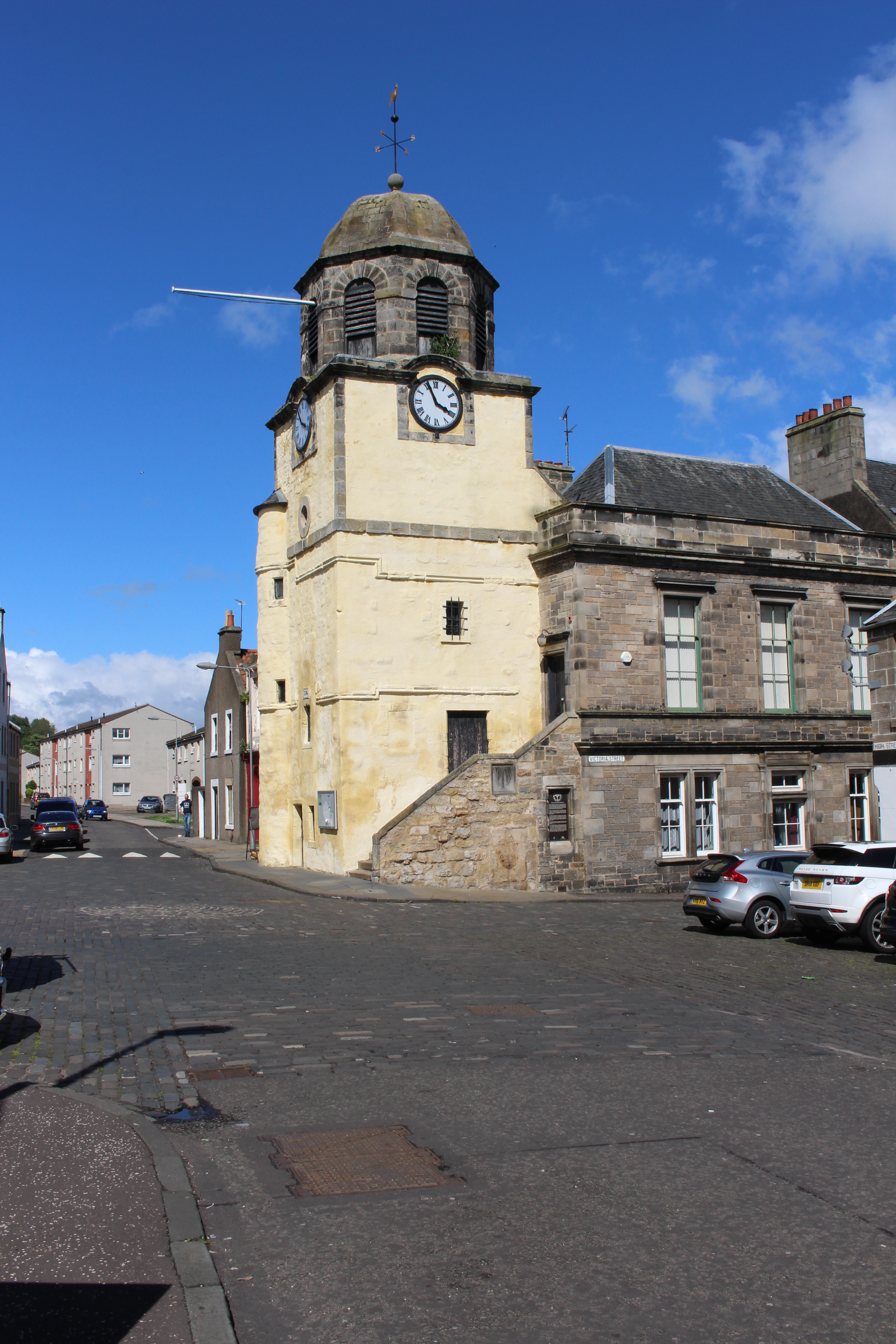
- Dysart Tolbooth and Town House

- Shown in Fife
- 56.1260°N 3.1209°W
- Location: High Street, Dysart

History
- Built: 1576

Site notes
- Architectural style: Scottish medieval style

Listed Building – Category A
- Official name: Dysart, High Street and Victoria Street, Tolbooth and Town Hall
- Designated: 28 January 1971
- Reference no.: LB36418

Dysart Tolbooth and Town House is a municipal building in the High Street, Dysart, Fife, Scotland. The structure, which was comprehensively restored in 2009, is a Category A listed building.

== History ==
The first municipal building in the town was a tolbooth tower erected in 1567. This does not appear to have been successful as it was demolished, just eight years later, in 1575, and replaced by the present three-stage tower, which was built in harled stone and erected slightly to the south of the original structure, in 1576. The first stage of the tower contained a doorway, while the second and third stages were originally blind, although a clock was installed in the third stage in 1592. There was a round stair-tower at the northeast corner of the building which provided access to the upper levels, and the building was extended to create a prison in 1617: five women were accused of witchcraft and incarcerated there in 1630.

After roundhead troops started using the building to store gunpowder during the English Civil War, the roof of the building was blown off by an accidental explosion in 1651. A forestair leading up to a doorway on the southwest side was added in 1717 and repairs were carried out to the building in 1719. Andrew St Clair, 12th Lord Sinclair, whose seat was at Dysart House, commissioned improvements to the tower in 1743. These works involved remodelling the tower with a new octagonal belfry surmounted by an ogee-shaped roof and a weather vane. The improvements were undertaken by Alexander Mawer at a cost of £499 to a design by John Douglas of Edinburgh and were completed in 1744. The building was then extended down Victoria Street to provide an assembly hall in 1765.

By the early 1880s, the Victoria Street extension had become very dilapidated, and the burgh leaders decided to replace it with a new town house. The new building was designed by Campbell Douglas and James Sellars in the neoclassical style, built in ashlar stone and was completed in 1888. The design involved a main frontage of three bays facing onto Victoria Street. The central bay contained a doorway which was flanked by bi-partite windows in the outer bays, and there were three sash windows on the first floor. Internally, the principal rooms were the council chamber, the courtroom and the magistrates' room. The burgh council, which had previously held their meetings in St Serf's Church, then started using the new council chamber.

The building continued to serve as the meeting place of the burgh council into the 20th century but ceased to be the local seat of government when the area was absorbed by Kirkcaldy Burgh Council in 1930. After a long period of disuse, the fabric of the building deteriorated and the structure again became dilapidated. A major programme of refurbishment works, financed by Fife Council, the National Heritage Lottery Fund and Historic Scotland, started on site at a ceremony attended by the Member of the Scottish Parliament, Marilyn Livingstone, in April 2009. The works formed part of a wide programme of regeneration in the town which was completed in 2014.

== See also ==
- List of listed buildings in Kirkcaldy, Fife
- List of Category A listed buildings in Fife
