= Kirkcaldy Sheriff Court =

Judicial building in Kirkcaldy, Scotland

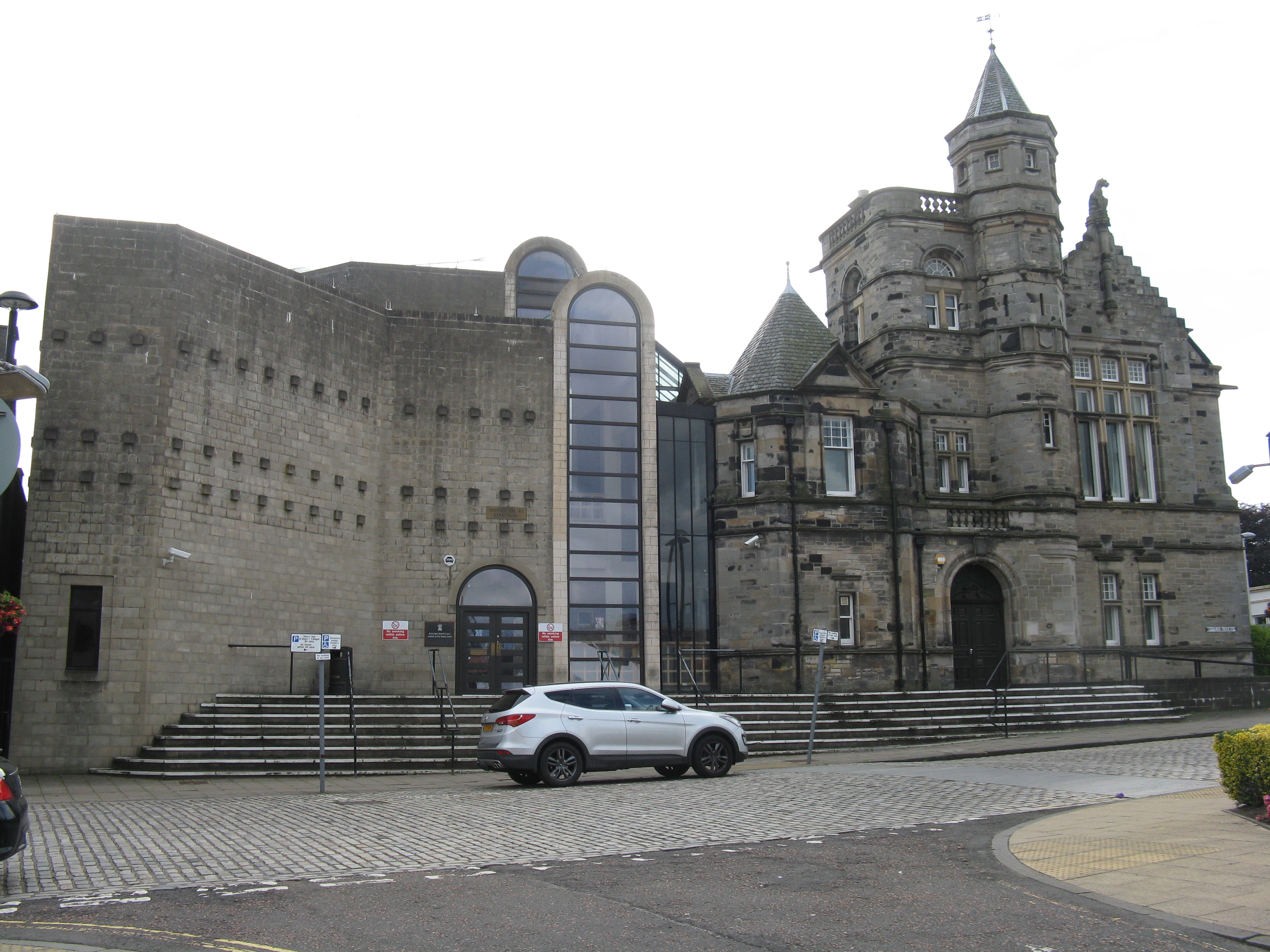
- The building in 2017

- Shown in Fife
- 56.1093°N 3.1631°W
- Location: Whytescauseway, Kirkcaldy

History
- Built: 1894

Site notes
- Architect: James Ross Gillespie
- Architectural style: Scottish baronial style

Listed Building – Category B
- Official name: Kirkcaldy Sheriff Court including boundary wall and excluding large extension to east, Whytescauseway, Kirkcaldy
- Designated: 27 February 1997
- Reference no.: LB44108

Kirkcaldy Sheriff Court, formerly known as County Buildings, is a judicial building on Whytescauseway in Kirkcaldy in Scotland. The building, which continues to operate a courthouse, is a Category B listed building.

== History ==
Until the late 19th century, court hearings were held in the old townhouse and jail at the junction of High Street and Tolbooth Street which was completed in 1826. After finding this arrangement unsatisfactory, court officials decided to commission a dedicated courthouse: the site they selected was on the south side of Whytescauseway.

The new building was designed by James Ross Gillespie in the Scottish baronial style, built in rubble masonry at a cost of £9,000 and was officially opened by Sheriff Aeneas Mackay on 21 May 1894. After it opened, it was initially known as "County Buildings".

The design involved an asymmetrical main frontage of three bays facing onto Whytescauseway. The centre bay featured a three-stage tower: there was a round headed doorway with voussoirs and a keystone in the first stage, a mullioned and transomed window in the second stage and a mullioned window with a Diocletian window above in the third stage, all surmounted by a balustrade. To the right of the centre bay there was a four-stage octagonal turret, which was projected forward from the upper floors of the building: there a small casement window in the first stage, a series of lancet windows in the second stage, blind walls with corner colonettes in the third stage, and a series of small windows in the fourth stage, all surmounted by a conical roof and a weather vane. The left-hand bay, which was hexagon-shaped, was fenestrated by sash windows on both floors and surmounted by a pediment with a hexagon-shaped roof behind. The right-hand bay was fenestrated by a pair of sash windows on the ground floor and by a nine-pane window on the first floor, all surmounted by a stepped gable and a finial. Internally, the principal room was a double-height courtroom on the first floor, behind the nine-pane window.

A large extension, with a blind canted wall on the left, a round headed doorway in the centre and a full-height round headed atrium to the right, was added to the east of the main building in 1982. An annexe to the sheriff court, incorporating two new criminal courtrooms as well as a new custody suite, was opened in the former police station on St. Brycedale Avenue on 29 July 2020. The building on Whytescauseway remains the main venue for hearings of the Kirkcaldy Sheriff Court.

== See also ==
- List of listed buildings in Kirkcaldy, Fife
