= Bennett Plantation House =

Historic house in Louisiana, United States

- U.S. National Register of Historic Places
- Location within Louisiana Location within the United States
- Location: 6291 Old Baton Rouge Highway, Alexandria, Louisiana
- Coordinates: 31°13′16″N 92°25′11″W
- Area: less than one acre
- Built: 1854
- Architect: Bennett, Ezra
- Architectural style: Greek Revival, Renaissance
- NRHP reference No.: 79001083
- Added to NRHP: May 14, 1979

The Bennett Plantation House in Alexandria, Louisiana was built in 1854. The house and associated store building were added to the National Register of Historic Places in 1979.

Their current or former location is or was east of Alexandria on Hwy 71 between Cheneyville and Bunkie. The house was moved in June 2006 to its current location.

The NRHP nomination describes:

The commercial significance of the Bennett place lies in the fact that it was part of the important Bayou Boeuf navigation trade with New Orleans. The owner, Ezra Bennett, acted as local agent for New Orleans cotton factors, making the store an important commercial focal point for local planters. Ezra Bennett came to Eldred's Bend on Bayou Boeuf from New York in 1830.He came to teach school, either as a private tutor in a village or as a resident at some plantation. The rich land of the'area had been settled comparatively recently and Bayou "Boeuf provided access to the outspLde world-for the planter's produce. The first store at Eldred's Bend had been built by Joseph B. Robert. Soon after Bennett's arrival in the area, he gave up his career as an educator and worked as a clerk in the store. Somewhat later, he was able to buy the store from Robert, making six yearly payments. Ezra Bennett, who was known for his thrift, expanded the business and became an agent for factors in New Orleans. Bennett kept careful records and copies of all his business letters. Most of his business was done with New Orleans factors, though he also had dealings with lawyers and people from his native New York. Apparently, Bennett prospered and became an important businessman in the area. In 1860, J. W. Dorr, a Picayune reporter travpling through the state, reported that Ezra Bennett was one of the outstanding citizens of the parish."
