= Dysart, Fife =

Town in Fife, Scotland

Coordinates: 56.13°N 3.12°W

Dysart: Scottish Gaelic: Dìseart; Little Holland
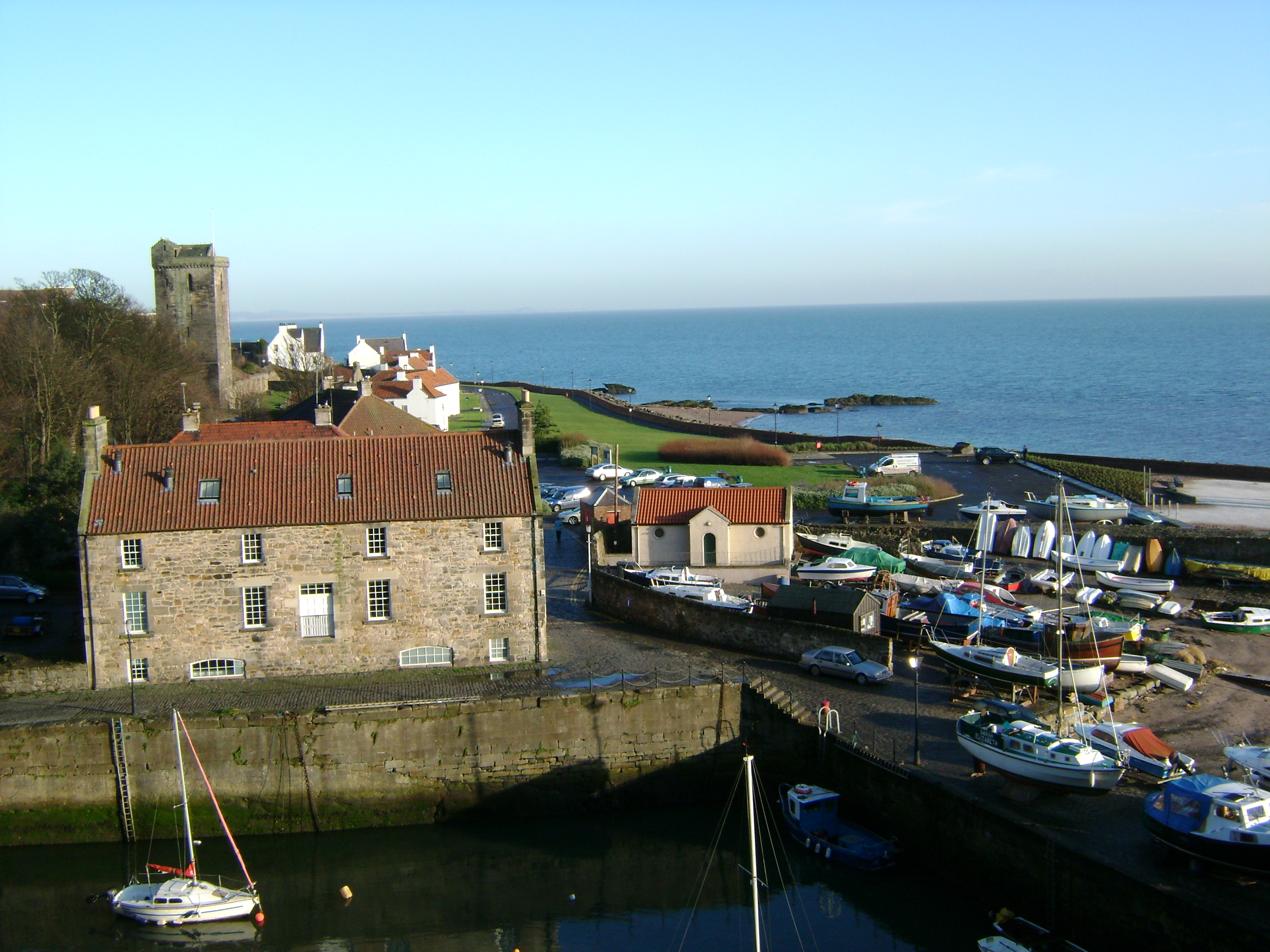
- A view of Dysart harbour with Harbourmaster's House and the remains of St Serf's Church being visible to the north-east

- Location within Fife
- OS grid reference: NT303931
- Council area: Fife
- Lieutenancy area: Fife
- Country: Scotland
- Sovereign state: United Kingdom
- Post town: KIRKCALDY
- Postcode district: KY1
- Dialling code: 01592
- Police: Scotland
- Fire: Scottish
- Ambulance: Scottish
- UK Parliament: Cowdenbeath and Kirkcaldy
- Scottish Parliament: Kirkcaldy

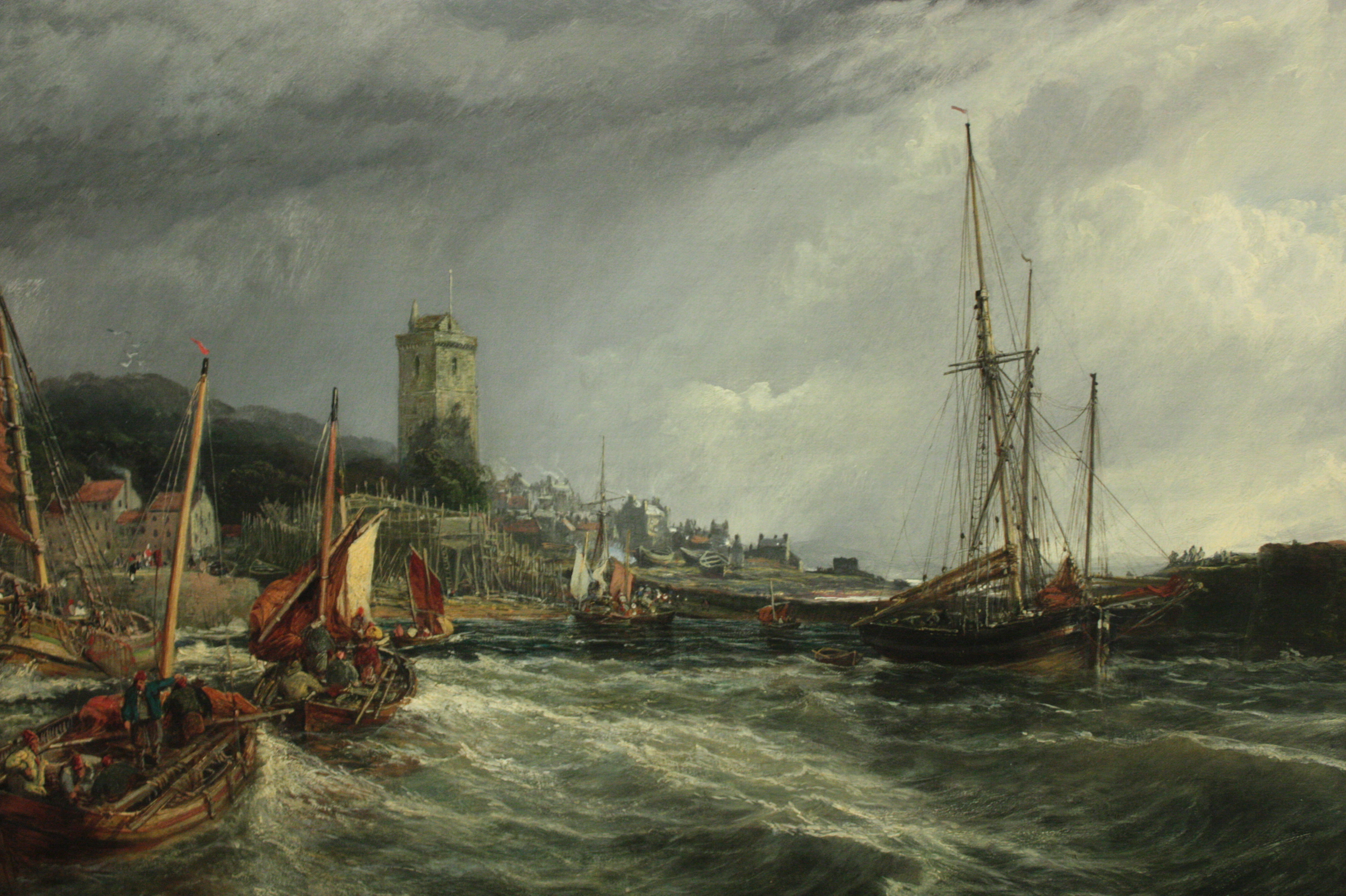
Dysart Harbour in 1854 by Sam Bough RSA

Dysart (/ˈdaɪzərt/; Scottish Gaelic: Dìseart (IPA:[ˈtʲiːʃəɾʃt̪])) is a town and former royal burgh located on the south-east coast between Kirkcaldy and West Wemyss in Fife, Scotland. Dysart was once part of a wider estate owned by the St Clair or Sinclair family. They were responsible for gaining burgh of barony status for the town towards the end of the 15th century.

The first record of the town was made in the early 13th century, its initial role being to settle civil matters between the church and landowners. During the middle of the 15th century, trade with the Low Countries began for salt and coal exportation. In the 16th and 17th centuries, trade expanded to the Baltic Countries. Dysart acquired two nicknames: "Salt Burgh" and "Little Holland" as a result.

Following the sudden decline of the town's harbour caused by the closure of the Lady Blanche Pit, the town was amalgamated into the royal burgh of Kirkcaldy under an act of Parliament, the Kirkcaldy Corporation Order Confirmation Act 1930 (20 & 21 Geo. 5. c. xciii). Urban clearance during the 1950s and 1960s saw large parts of the historic town demolished for new housing. Demand from the town's residents meant that part of the historic town — most notably the 16th-century and the 18th-century houses of Pan Ha' opposite the harbour — were salvaged and preserved for future generations.

== History ==
The name of the town derives from the Scottish Gaelic, dìseart, meaning "a hermitage or religious retreat", which itself was a loan-word from the Latin, desertum, meaning "a desert or deserted place". This is most likely linked to Saint Serf, who lived as a hermit in a cave in the area in the 8th century.

Prior to the 16th century, little is known about the history of the town. The earliest record of the town's existence is a document about a papal decision between Dysart Kirk and Dunfermline Abbey in 1220. Another record followed in 1245, this time about the reconsecration of Dysart Kirk undertaken by David de Bernham of St Andrews. The initial role of the town, like many communities in Scotland, was to serve the church and landowners by resolving civic matters and dealing individually with property issues.

The first port has been said to date as far back as 1450. This helped the export of coal and salt with the town's trading partner, the Low Countries. A man-made harbour was eventually built, but could only be used at low tide with limited space. The damage caused by the jetty which was commonly known as the "east haven of Dysart" temporarily cut short the function of the east pier in the mid-17th century. The harbour was later extensively rebuilt in 1829-31 with the assistance of Robert Stephenson, to include an inner basin with a nearby quarry at the harbour head and an extension of the east pier which would be raised and pointed southwards.

During the 16th and 17th centuries, the town went through hard times with many residents, particularly skippers, being killed in the wars of covenanting (1644–1645) and the five-year occupation of Oliver Cromwell between 1651 and 1656. However, the salt trade prospered between the town and its two trading partners – Netherlands and the Baltic Countries with production thriving between 1570 and 1630. Subsequently, the town was given two nicknames: salt burgh (for the salt industry keeping the fish fresh for export) and later Little Holland (for the Dutch influence in Dysart's buildings inspired by the shipowners who went there). The first coal pit in the town - known as Lady Blanche - opened towards the end of the 16th century. Two new pits – Frances and Randolph – would follow by the middle of the 17th century as coal began to succeed in the salt trade. Meanwhile, the harbour was revived with the imports of wine and spirits being sent to other harbours at Leith, Dundee and Perth. The town's prosperity declined in the late 17th century and by 1715 the disrepair of the harbour was noted. Food shortages resulting from the export trade led to the town becoming a centre of the 1720 food riots, with estimates of 1,000 to 2,000 protestors on the streets and troops being overpowered and disarmed.

In the 1920s, the owners of the harbour, the Earl of Rossyln's Coal Company, put pressure on the town council to deepen the harbour for use of larger ships. The council was plunged into financial ruin after the coal company refused to pay for the work in excess of £500. Many ships went instead to Buckhaven and Methil, where they received a quicker turnaround than in Dysart. The closure of the uneconomic Lady Blanche Pit in 1929, proved to be the end of the town's coal trade from the harbour. The lack of revenue from Dysart's harbour forced the town to merge with Kirkcaldy under a local act of Parliament, the Kirkcaldy Corporation Order Confirmation Act 1930 (20 & 21 Geo. 5. c. xciii).

Dysart Golf Club (now defunct) was founded in 1897. The club and course closed at the time of WW2.

Today, Dysart is considered to be a north-eastern suburb of Kirkcaldy and the village forms one of 48 conservation areas in Fife. Important landmarks in the village include the Dutch influenced houses on Pan Ha'; the six-storey St Serf's Church Tower; Dysart Tolbooth and the Francis Collery gearhead which is situated on the northern boundaries. An £11 million pound scheme has been started by The Townscape Heritage Initiative (THI) and Conservation Area Grants Scheme (CARS) to regenerate Dysart over a period of five years, due to be completed in 2014. This will include repairing historic buildings and structures such as Dysart Tolbooth and Dysart Harbour as well as providing new housing and meeting environmental needs.

== Church ==
The pre-Reformation church in Dysart was dedicated to St Serf and was close to St Serf's Cave where he supposedly lived as a hermit. It was under command of the Collegiate Church of St Mary in St Andrews. A replacement church was built in 1802.

A second Free Church was built in 1874 designed by Campbell Douglas.

Parish ministers: Robert Danielston (1560–1565); Andrew Forester (1565–1574); George Scott (1574–1582); John Young (1582–1584); Thomas Wood (1584); William Murray (1584–1616); William Nairn (1616–1630); James Wilson (1643–1661); John Robertson (1661–62); John Anderson of Balram (1663–1707); David Pitcairn (1708–1757); Patrick Muirhead DD (1757–1807); his son George Muirhead (1807–1816); Peter Brotherston (1816–1828); David Murray (1828–1850); William Muir (1850–1864); James Simpson (1865–1901) blind; John Waugh Gibson, second charge (1865–1906); Hugh Menzies (1907–?).

== Governance ==
The Sinclair or St Clair family have held the position of feudal superiors or barons of the burgh of the estate of Dysart since 1407. They were responsible for gaining Burgh of barony status towards the end of the 15th century. Royal burgh status in the town has long been disputed. A main reason for this being the area was a commercial background. A missing charter was only confirmed in a charter granted by James VI in 1587. However the title was indeed granted to Dysart in 1594 with the honour of having a seat in the parliament. A dispute between the St Clair family and the town inhabitants about the right to use the moorland resources was referred to the Convention of Royal Burghs in 1694 and was resolved only in 1718.

Originally St Serf's Church was the meeting place of the town council, until this moved to Dysart Town House in 1877. The provost and town council met at this location once a week right up to the time of the loss of royal burgh status, when the town was amalgamated into Kirkcaldy in 1930. The town's former coat of arms was represented by an oak tree. This stood for the memory of the three trees planted in Dysart wood for the three Sinclair brothers. According to the tale, one night in the woods, the brothers were robbed and then killed each other. The site of Dysart Wood is most probably Ravenscraig Park.

== Landmarks ==
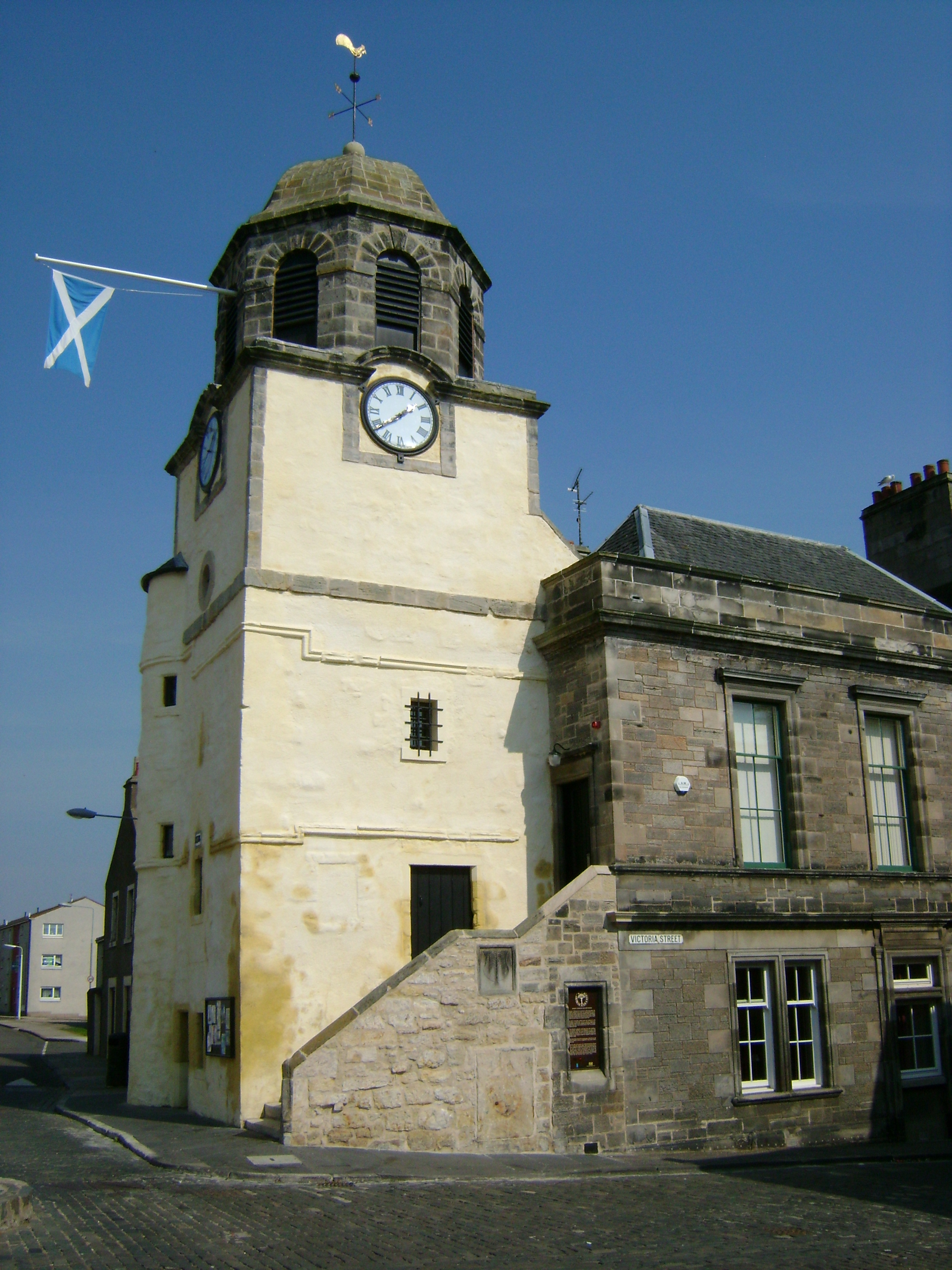
Dysart Tolbooth

The whole of Dysart is a conservation area. This was designated by the former Kirkcaldy District Council (KDC) on 8 May 1978. Dysart Tolbooth on the High Street, erected in 1576, is the centrepiece of Dysart's historic buildings. This was once used as a public weigh-in and measures house; guards house and eventually a prison built as an extension in 1617. The building was also known to keep explosives. When this was occupied by Oliver Cromwell's troops in 1651, one of them accidentally dropped a match into a barrel of gunpowder (which was abandoned by a Dysart merchant) causing the roof to be blown apart. The upper part of the building was rebuilt between 1733 and 1734 with an ashlar bell-chamber and a stone ogile roof. The neighbouring Dysart Town Hall was once used as the meeting place for the provost and town council.

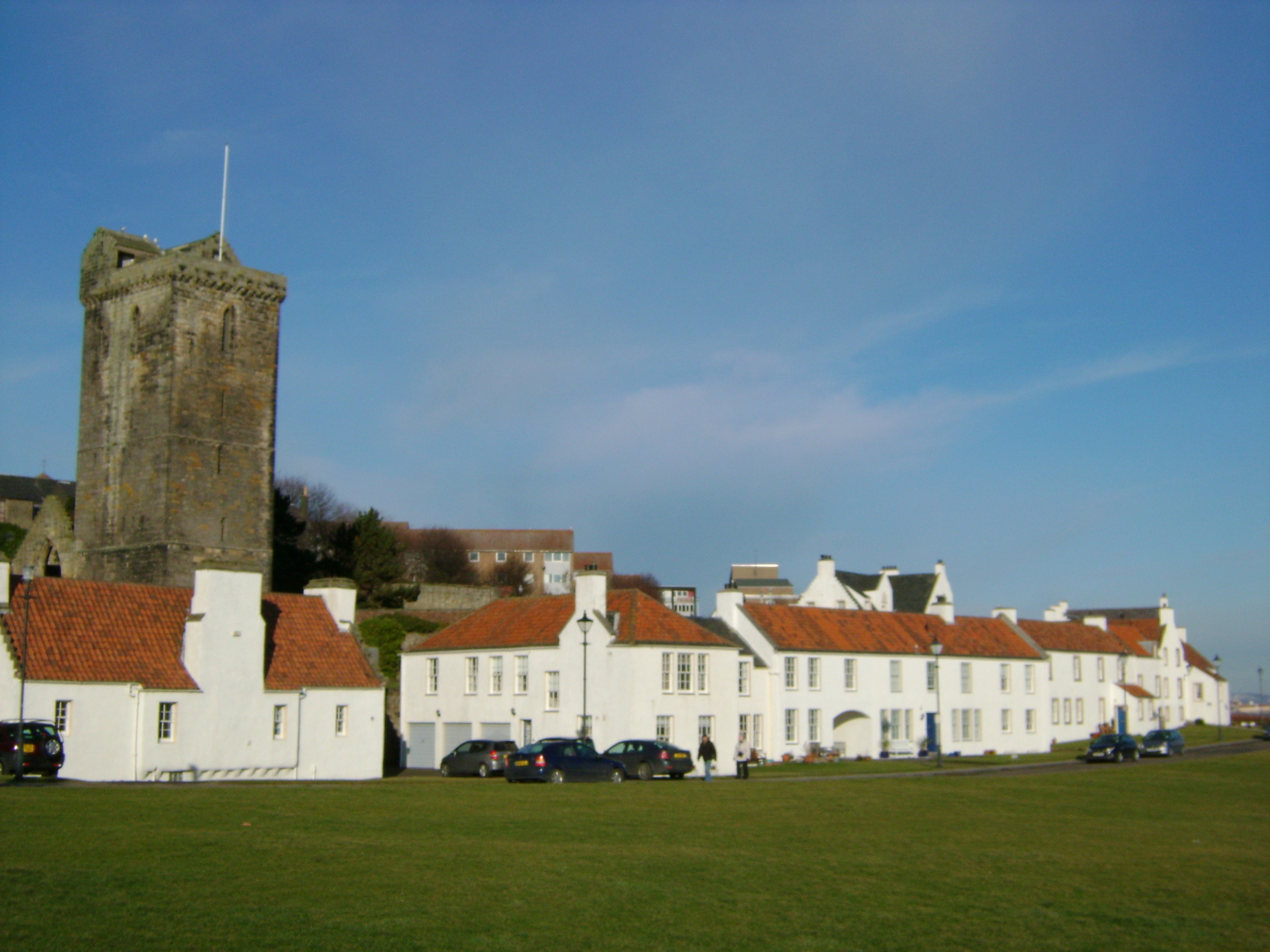
St Serf's tower and Pan Ha'

Other significant landmarks in the town include the 16th and 18th century painted dwellings on Pan Ha'; the six-storey St Serf's church tower and the harbour. Pan Ha', or to give the full title, Pan Haugh, means low-lying ground of the salt pans - hence the expression, "to carry saut to Dysart". Many of the houses have been restored by the National Trust for Scotland between 1968 and 1969 under the "little houses scheme". During the restoration of the former Bay Horse Inn at Pan Ha', once the residence of a son of Lord Sinclair, two renaissance painted ceilings were discovered and are still retained by Historic Scotland. The Duke of Holstein visited the Sinclair house in 1598.

St Serf's church tower on Shore Road dates from around 1500, is considered to be one of Scotland's finest examples of a battlemented church tower. This is the only remaining part of St Serf's Church, which was abandoned in 1802 and largely cleared away for the building of Shore Road in 1807.

The red headgear of the Francis Colliery is a landmark marking the northern boundaries of the town.

Dysart House, formerly the seat of the Earl of Rossyln, overlooks the harbour. The earliest section of the house is the south range built for General James St Clair between 1755 and 1756, for which it is believed that the Adam Brothers provided the chimney pieces and the design. The house was extended between 1808 and 1814 to include new rear wings. The three-storey harbourmaster's house in the grounds of the harbour dates from around 1840. Originally known as the shore house, this was used to store cargo from incoming ships, before being used by the harbourmaster. Today, the house is home to the headquarters of the Fife Countryside and Coast Trust and also has a bistro, shop and provides internet access.

== Notable residents ==
- Robert Beatson
- Lady Angela Forbes
- Rev George Muirhead
- John Pitcairn
- William Pitcairn
- Sir Norman Walker
- William Wallace (mathematician)
- John McDouall Stuart, explorer

== See also ==
- Dysart (Parliament of Scotland constituency)
