= Nathaniel and Elizabeth Bennett House =

Historic house in Maine, United States

- U.S. National Register of Historic Places
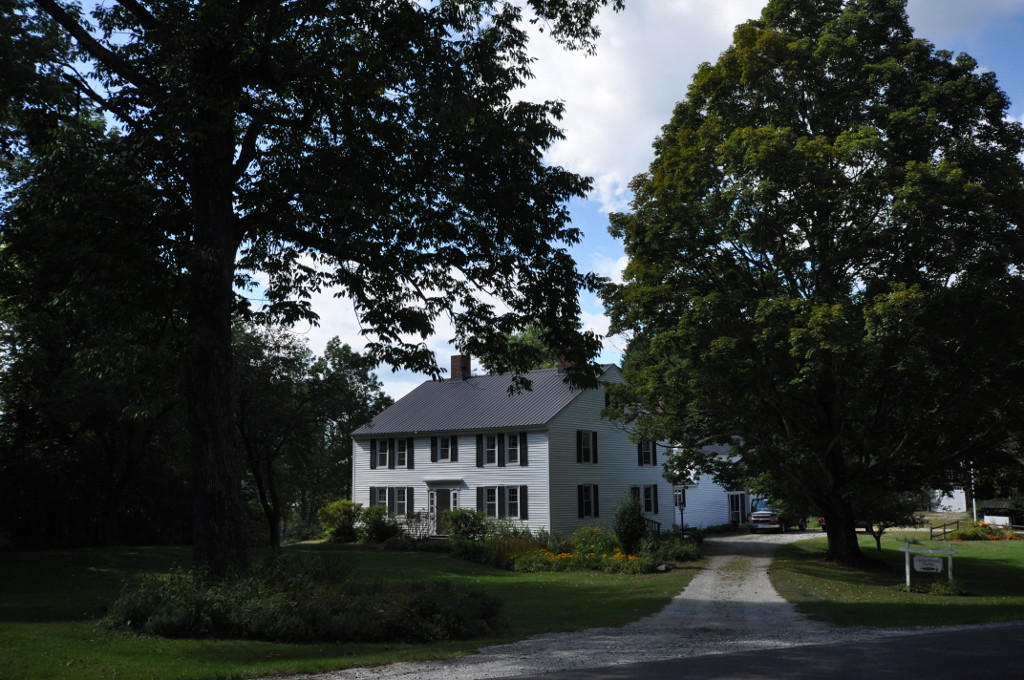

- Location within Maine Location within the United States
- Nearest city: Norway, Maine
- Coordinates: 44.22994°N 70.57285°W
- Area: 48 acres (19 ha)
- Built: 1792
- Architectural style: Federal
- NRHP reference No.: 96000652
- Added to NRHP: June 7, 1996

The Nathaniel and Elizabeth Bennett House, also locally known as the Cedarbrook Farm, is a historic house and farm property on the west side of Crockett Ridge Road in Norway, Maine, United States. The property is distinctive for its well-preserved Federal style house, including one room with an unusual form of stencil painting on its walls. It also has a historic association with Don Carlos Seitz, the editor of the New York World, who operated a gentleman's farm on the property. It was listed on the National Register of Historic Places in 1996.

== Description ==
The current farm property consists of 48 acres (19 ha), a remnant of the 150 acres (61 ha) purchased by Nathaniel Bennett in 1790. The house is a fairly typical south-facing five-bay Federal style wood-frame structure, with interior brick chimneys. The central doorway is framed by sidelight windows and fluted pilasters, and topped by a wide frieze and cornice. An ell extends from the rear of the house, connecting it to an English barn. The ell is a 1980s replacement for an earlier structure, which was likely narrower; the barn is of unknown construction date, but may be contemporaneous with the main block.

The interior of the main block consists of four rooms, two on either side of a central hallway, on each floor. The front rooms on both floors have raised paneling on the fireplace wall and wainscoting capped by a chair rail. The rear rooms are only modestly finished. The left front parlor has unusual stenciled artwork drawn on its walls. It is distinctively different from typical stencilwork of the period, which was often derived from the work of the itinerant artist Moses Eaton. A sky blue background is painted with a row of flowers, with two buds on each stem, and a group of leaves separated by a small yellow flower.

== History ==
The front half of the house is by tradition dated to 1792, not long after Nathaniel Bennett purchased the land. The back half was added in 1812, and the exterior doors were given their Greek Revival treatment sometime later. The Bennetts died childless, and the house was eventually sold to Don Carlos Seitz, publisher of the New York World. Seitz operated the property as a gentleman's farm and built a large barn (no longer extant, although its foundation survives) on the property north of the surviving barn; he was also responsible for naming the property "Cedarbrook Farm." His estate sold the property to one of his hired hands in 1927, and the property was operated as tourist accommodations.

== See also ==
- National Register of Historic Places listings in Oxford County, Maine
