= Lane-Bennett House =

Historic house in North Carolina, United States

- U.S. National Register of Historic Places
- Location within North Carolina Location within the United States
- Location: 7408 Ebenezer Church Rd., near Raleigh, North Carolina
- Coordinates: 35°52′17″N 78°44′27″W
- Area: 1.2 acres (0.49 ha)
- Built: 1775
- Architectural style: Georgian
- NRHP reference No.: 77001011
- Added to NRHP: June 30, 1983

Lane-Bennett House, also known as the Joe Bennett House, is a historic home located near Raleigh, Wake County, North Carolina. The original section was built in 1775, and is a one-story, L-shaped, Georgian-style frame dwelling. The original three bay section is covered by a very steep gable roof and has a shed roofed front porch. The house was originally located in present day Cary, but moving the house was necessitated when the land was purchased by developer Jeff Sugg to construct an office park, now known as Regency Park. The house was moved to its present location in 1980, along with a contributing smokehouse, and subsequently restored.

It was listed on the National Register of Historic Places in 1983.
