= George Bennett (cricketer, born 1832) =

English cricketer

Personal information
- Full name: George Bennett
- Born: 2 August 1832; Naples, Kingdom of the Two Sicilies
- Died: 11 March 1913 (aged 80); Southbourne, Hampshire, England
- Batting: Unknown
- Role: Wicket-keeper

Domestic team information
- Years: Team
- 1852–1856: Oxford University

Career statistics
Competition	First-class
Matches	2
Runs scored	0
Batting average	0.00
100s/50s	–/–
Top score	0
Catches/stumpings	2/–
- Source: Cricinfo, 14 January 2020

George Bennett (2 August 1832 — 11 March 1913) was an English first-class cricketer.

The son of Henry Bennett, he was born on 2 August 1832 in Naples, Italy. He was first educated at Winchester College, before attending St John's College, Oxford. While studying at Oxford, Bennett played two first-class cricket matches for Oxford University separated by four years. His first match came against the Marylebone Cricket Club at Oxford in 1852, with his second appearance coming against Cambridge University at Lord's in 1856. He failed to score any runs in his two appearances and was dismissed without scoring in all three of his batting innings. After graduating from Oxford he joined the Civil Service, where he worked as a senior clerk at the Office of Woods and Forests. Bennett died on 11 March 1913 in Southbourne, Hampshire.
