= Salmon Washburn House =

Historic house in Massachusetts, United States

- U.S. National Register of Historic Places
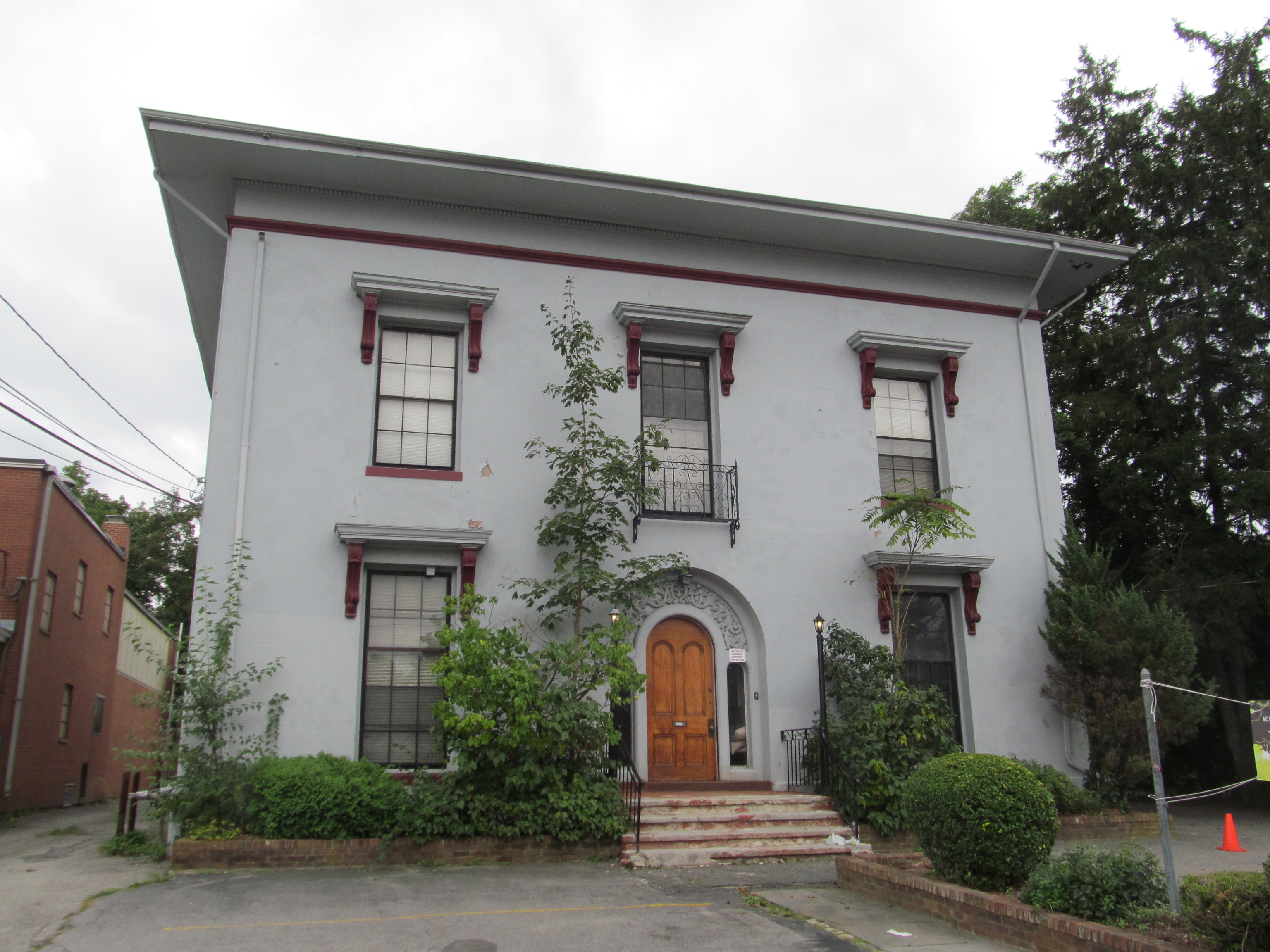
- Salmon Washburn House, September 2012

- Location within Massachusetts Location within the United States
- Location: 68 Winthrop St., Taunton, Massachusetts
- Coordinates: 41°53′50″N 71°5′52″W
- Built: 1860
- MPS: Taunton MRA
- NRHP reference No.: 84002258
- Added to NRHP: July 5, 1984

The Salmon Washburn House is a historic house located at 68 Winthrop Street in Taunton, Massachusetts.

== Description and history ==
It was built in 1860 for prosperous local businessman Salmon Washburn, who ran a furniture, housewares and hardware business on Main Street. The two-story house is built on a square plan with a low-pitch hipped roof and very broad cornice. Dominating the stucco façade is a bold, semi-circular-arched doorway inset with an elaborate cast-iron screen, cast in foliate pattern, in the transom area. The windows are capped by large decorative drip moldings.

It was added to the National Register of Historic Places on July 5, 1984.

The Massachusetts Historical Commission Form B was incorrectly marked as "Samuel Washburn House".

== See also ==
- National Register of Historic Places listings in Taunton, Massachusetts
