= Bennett Family House =

Historic house in New York, United States

- U.S. National Register of Historic Places
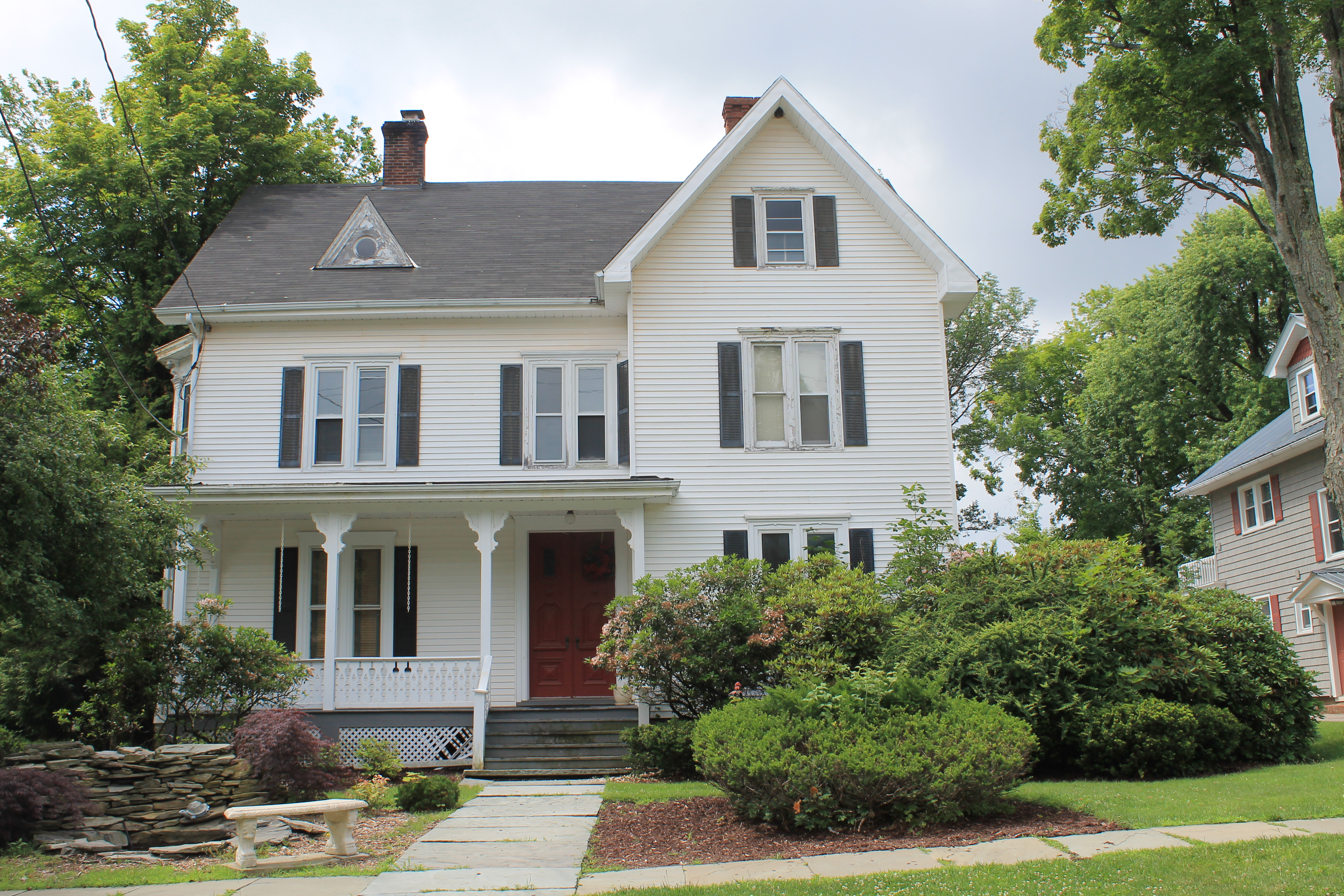
- Bennett Family House, Monticello, NY June 2013

- Location within New York Location within the United States
- Location: 11 Hamilton Ave., Monticello, New York
- Coordinates: 41°39′20″N 74°40′58″W
- Area: less than one acre
- Built: 1880
- Architectural style: Late Victorian
- NRHP reference No.: 01001400
- Added to NRHP: December 28, 2001

Bennett Family House is a historic home located at Monticello in Sullivan County, New York. It was built in 1880 is a 2 1/2-story, wood-frame, L-shaped dwelling with a long one-story rear wing. The main block is three bays wide and two bays deep on a dressed-stone foundation and topped by a gable roof. It features an ornate period interior.

It was added to the National Register of Historic Places in 2001.
