= Bennett-Shattuck House =

Historic house in Massachusetts, United States

- U.S. National Register of Historic Places
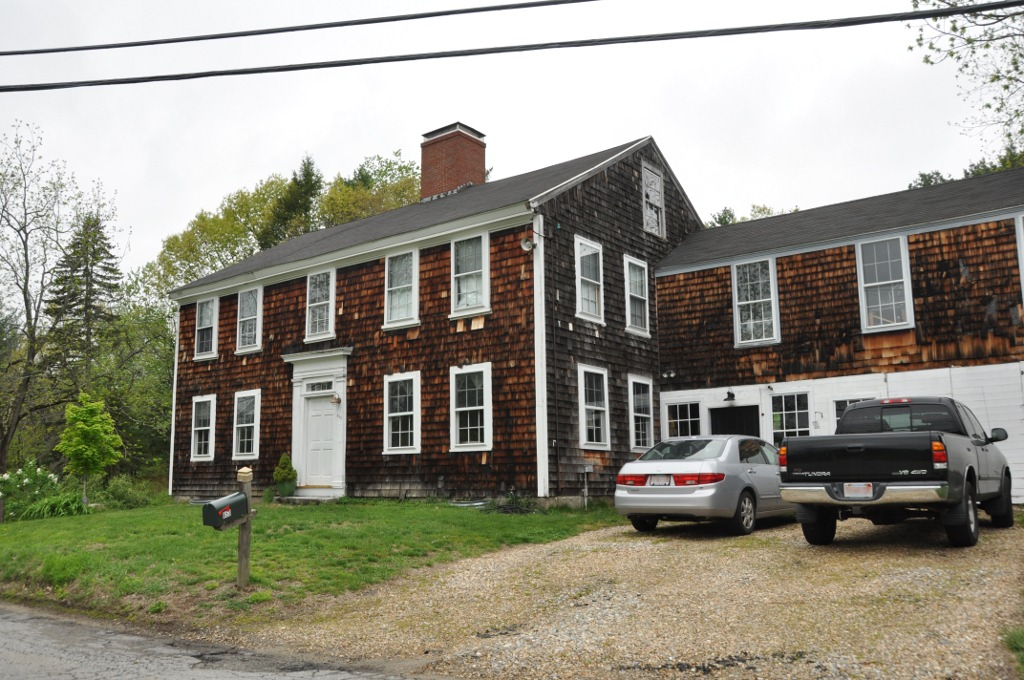

- Location within Massachusetts Location within the United States
- Location: Groton, Massachusetts
- Coordinates: 42°37′22″N 71°32′5″W
- Area: 1.8 acres (0.73 ha)
- Architectural style: Federal
- NRHP reference No.: 06000061
- Added to NRHP: February 22, 2006

The Bennett-Shattuck House is a historic house at 653 Martins Pond Road in Groton, Massachusetts. Built c. 1812, it is a well-preserved example of rural Federal period architecture, and is associated with a property that was farmed for two centuries. The house was listed on the National Register of Historic Places in 2006. Most of its associated farm property is now local conservation land.

== Description and history ==
The Bennett-Shattuck House is located on the north side of Martins Pond Road, a winding lane passing through the rural northeastern part of the community. The house consists of a main block, 2 1/2 stories in height, with a side gable roof and central chimney, from which a two-story ell extends to the right. The main facade, oriented roughly southward, is five bays wide, with a center entrance that is framed by pilasters supporting an entablature with cornice. The exterior finish is wooden shingles, the roof is asphalt, and the foundation is split fieldstone. The ell, three bays wide, is set back from the front, and also has a side-gable roof. The interior retains a significant amount of original material, including its principal staircase, as well as trim, plaster walls, and wide pine floorboards in most of its rooms. Only the kitchen has been substantially modernized on the ground floor; the left front room retains a swinging hook (used in period cooking fireplaces) and a bake oven. The ell, apparently built to house a workshop, has a completely unfinished first floor interior, with exposed balloon framing.

The house was built about 1812, after the previous house (probably set on the same foundation) was destroyed by fire. The oldest documented house on this property was standing in 1738. The current house was probably built by Joseph Sawtell, a local builder, for Joseph Bennett. Acquired by Eliza and Arthur Shattuck in 1879, it remained in their family until 1967. The Bennetts, Shattucks, and intervening owners all actively farmed the property, which originally included 30 acres (12 ha) of land across the street, which is now town-owned conservation land. The last active farming use of the property was about 1989. The property was thereafter acquired by the Groton Land Foundation, which subdivided the land, and has resold the house with preservation restrictions.

== See also ==
- National Register of Historic Places listings in Middlesex County, Massachusetts
