= George Bennett (Australian cricketer) =

Australian cricketer

Personal information
- Born: 16 August 1906; Brookvale, New South Wales, Australia
- Died: 15 April 1983 (aged 76); Sydney, Australia
- Source: ESPNcricinfo, 22 December 2016

George Bennett (16 August 1906 – 15 April 1983) was an Australian cricketer. He played one first-class match for New South Wales in 1933/34.

== See also ==
- List of New South Wales representative cricketers
