= Bennett-Tobler-Pace-Oliver House =

Historic house in Missouri, United States

- U.S. National Register of Historic Places
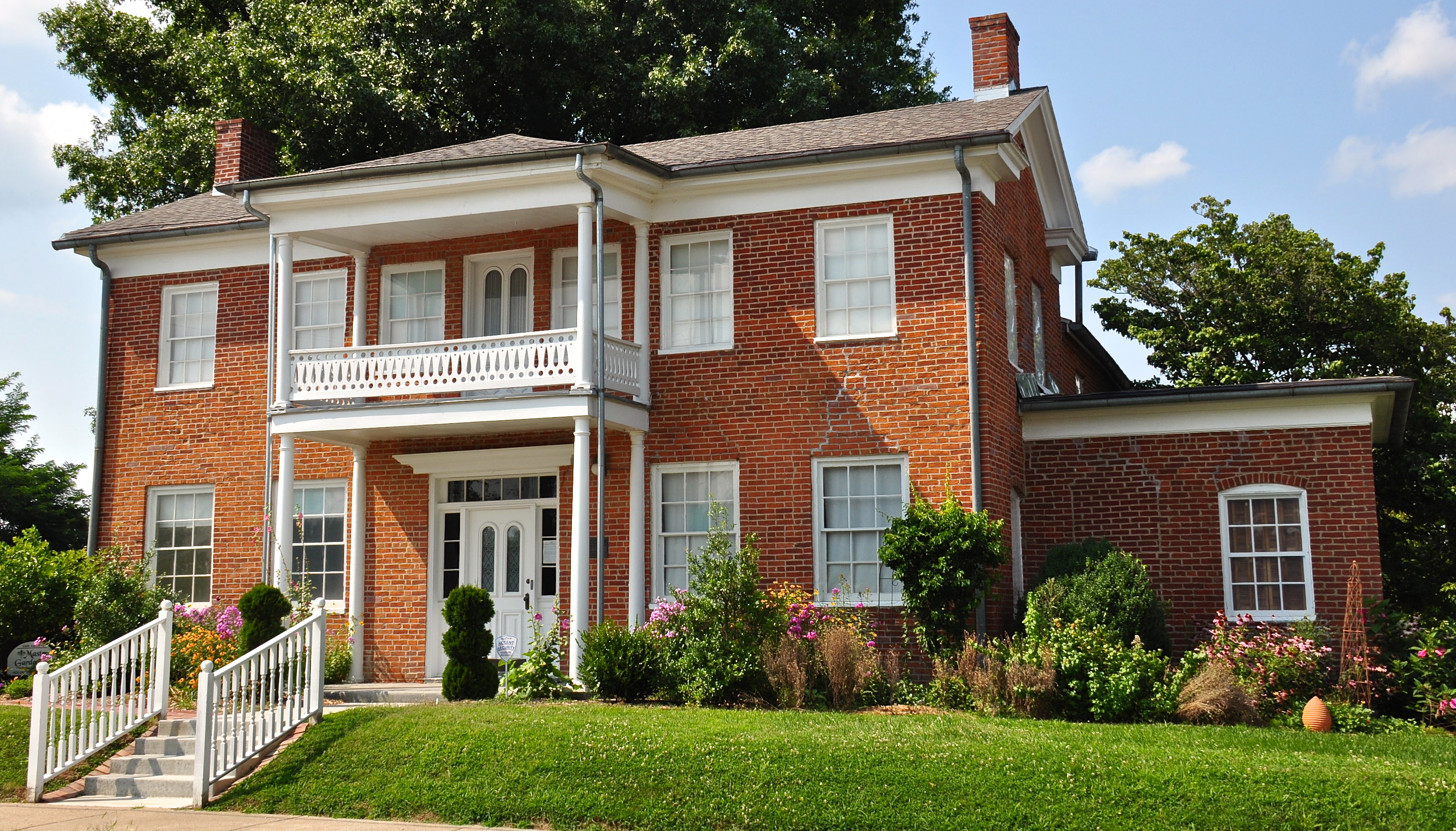
- Bennett-Tobler-Pace-Oliver House, July 2014

- Location within Missouri Location within the United States
- Location: 224 E. Adams, Jackson, Missouri
- Coordinates: 37.38153°N 89.66567°W
- Area: less than one acre
- Built: 1848
- Architect: Multiple
- Architectural style: Greek Revival
- NRHP reference No.: 85000853
- Added to NRHP: April 18, 1985

Bennett-Tobler-Pace-Oliver House, also known as the Oliver House, is a historic home located at Jackson, Cape Girardeau County, Missouri. It was built in 1848, and is a two-story, five-bay, L-shaped, Greek Revival style brick dwelling. It has a one-story addition and a two-story service wing. It features a two-story porch on the front facade.

It was listed on the National Register of Historic Places in 1985.

A website for the house museum is at https://jacksonpast.net.
