= Kempf House Museum =

- Henry Bennett House
- U.S. National Register of Historic Places
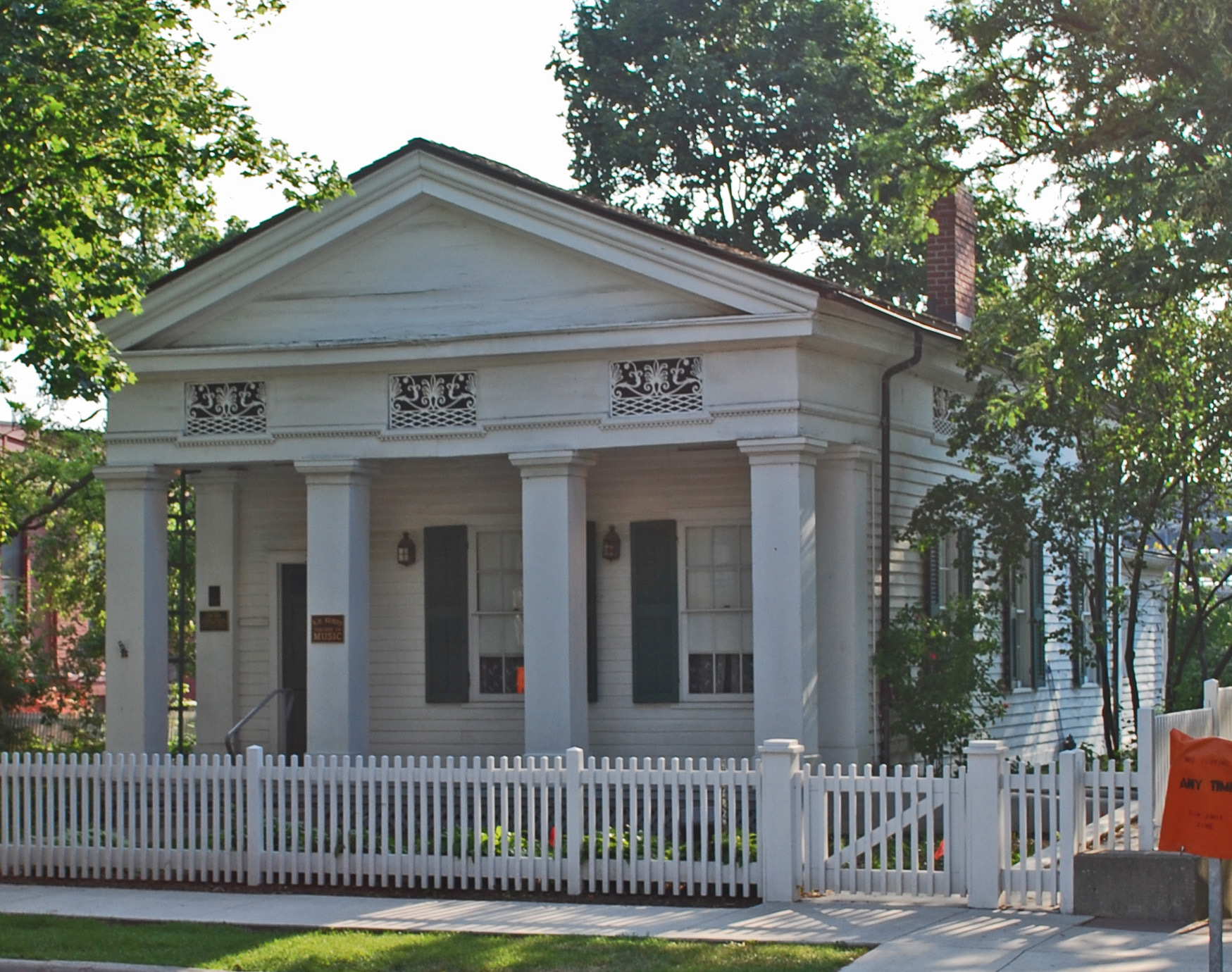
- Interactive map
- Location: 312 S. Division St., Ann Arbor, Michigan
- Coordinates: 42°16′44″N 83°44′40″W
- Area: less than one acre
- Built: 1853
- Architectural style: Greek Revival
- NRHP reference No.: 73000959
- Added to NRHP: March 1, 1973

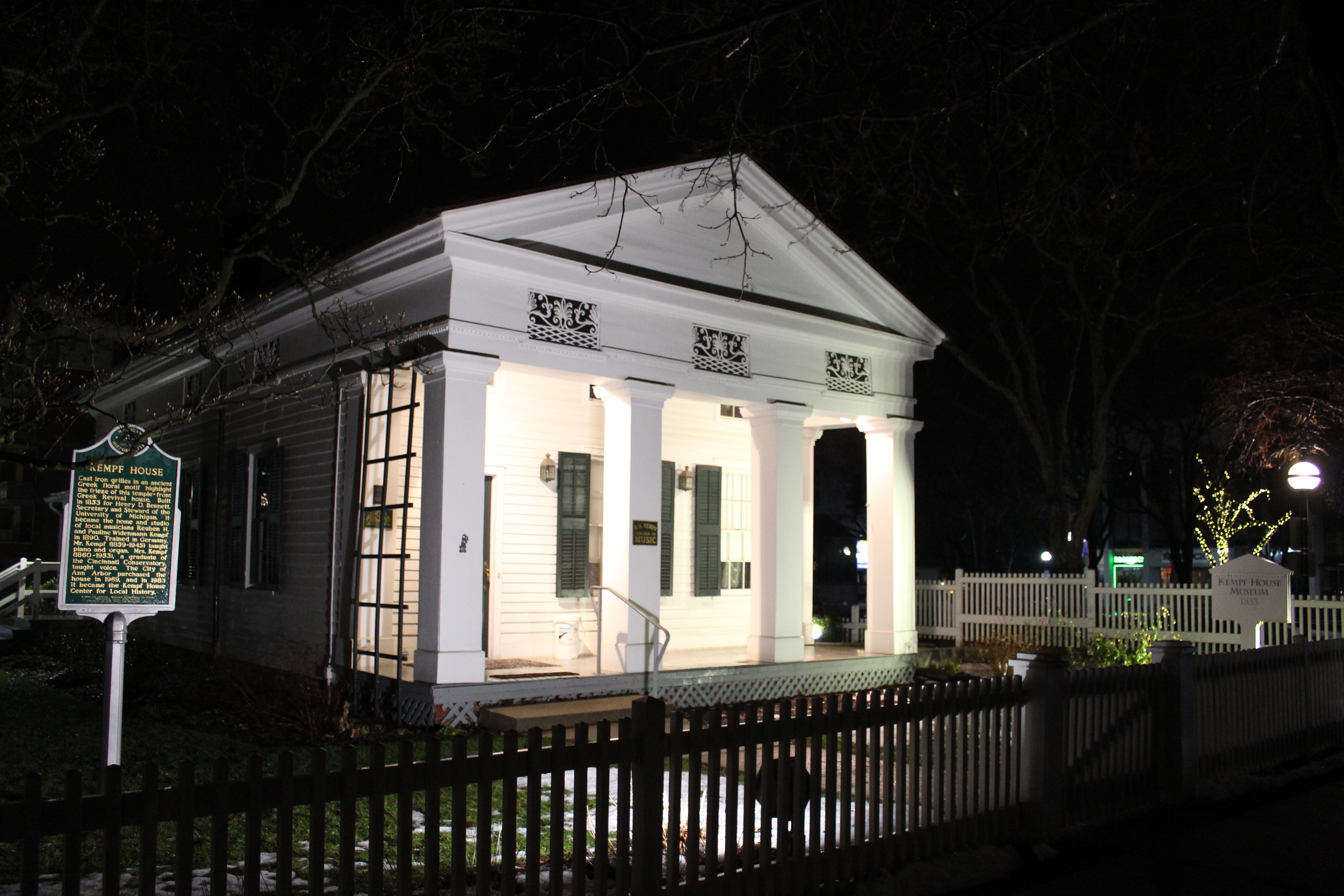
Kempf House at night

The Kempf House Museum, also known as the Henry Bennett House or the Reuben Kempf House, is a museum located at 312 South Division Street in Ann Arbor, Michigan. It was originally built as a single-family home in 1853. It was listed on the National Register of Historic Places in 1973.

== History ==
Henry DeWitt Bennet was the postmaster of Ann Arbor during most of the 1850s. In about 1853, Bennett had this house built. Bennett was later the secretary and steward of the University of Michigan In 1886 Bennet retired and moved to California, selling his house to a neighbor. The neighbor rented it out for a few years, and in 1890 sold the house to Reuben and Pauline Kempf. Both Reuben and Pauline Kempf were musicians, and their home turned into a local center for the musical arts. The Kempfs hosted musical figures such as Ignacy Jan Paderewski, Victor Herbert, and Ernestine Schumann-Heink. The Kempfs lived in the house until their deaths: Reuben's in 1945 and Pauline's in 1953. In 1953, Mr. and Mrs. Earl V. Parker purchased the house.

In 1969, Earl Parker died and the city of Ann Arbor acquired the house. The city turned the house into a historic museum. The house has been restored, and includes a music studio that looks as it did when the Kempfs were first giving lessons. The house is open for tours weekly.

== Description ==
The Bennett House is a frame, 1-1/2 story, temple style Greek Revival house sitting on a brick foundation. The facade has four massive, squared Doric columns, along with three frieze windows and a graceful tympaneum. The main section of the house measures 54 feet by 23 feet. A small, two-room addition holding the kitchen, built in the 1890s, is attached to the rear. The house currently has six rooms and bath on the first floor, and three bedrooms and 1-1/2 baths on the second.
