= Healy Block Residential Historic District =

Historic district in Minnesota, United States

- U.S. National Register of Historic Places
- U.S. Historic district
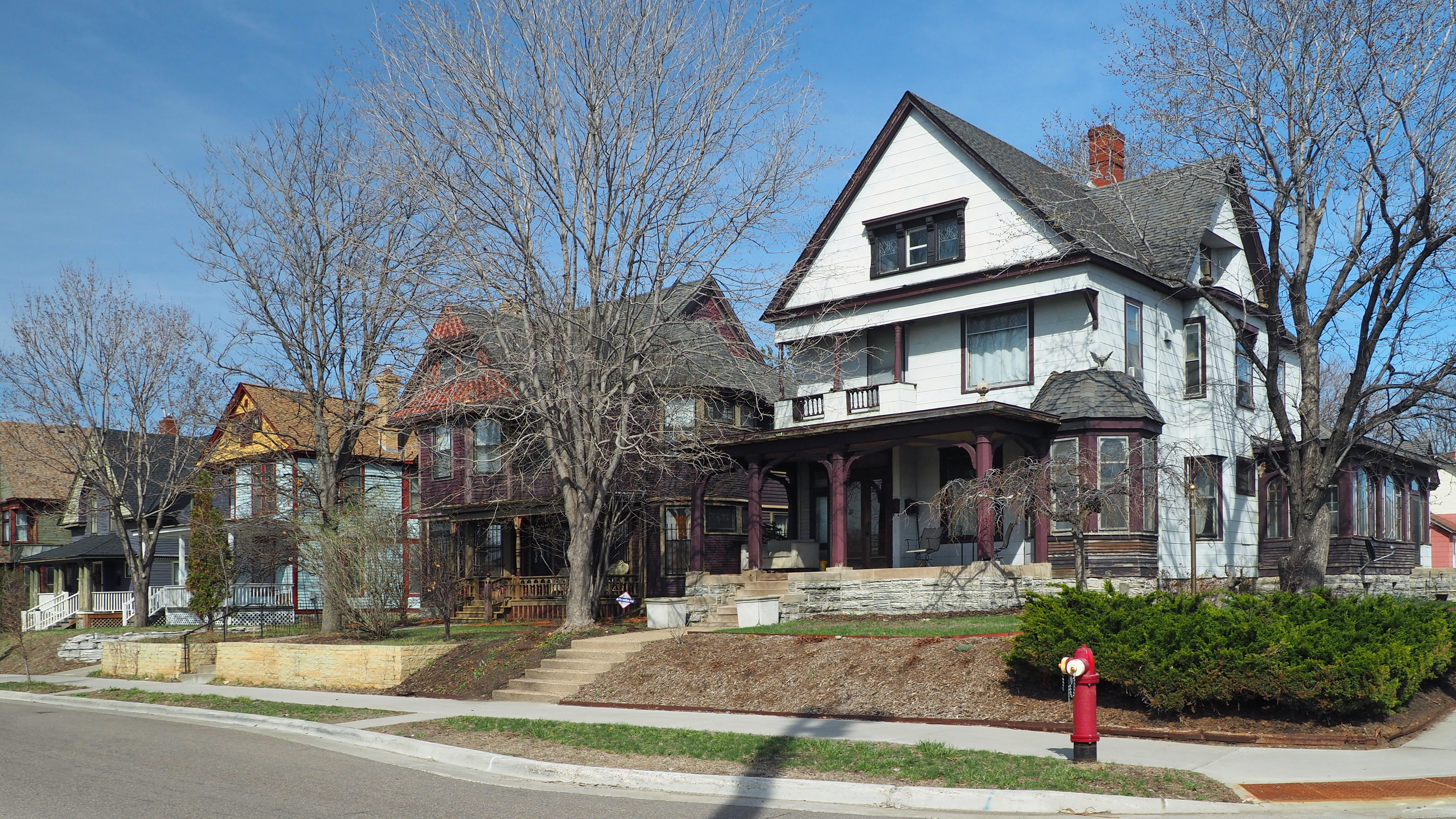
- The Healy Block Residential Historic District from the southwest

- Location within Minnesota Location within the United States
- Location: 3101–3145 2nd Ave. S. and 3116–3124 3rd Ave. S., Minneapolis, Minnesota
- Coordinates: 44°56′45″N 93°16′23″W
- Built: 1886–1898
- Architect: Theron Potter Healy
- Architectural style: Queen Anne
- NRHP reference No.: 93000417
- Added to NRHP: May 27, 1993

The Healy Block is a historic district of 14 Queen Anne style houses in Minneapolis, Minnesota, United States. The district, listed on the National Register of Historic Places and as a Minneapolis Historic District, is bounded by Second Avenue South, 31st Street, Third Avenue South and 32nd Street. The houses are readily visible from the Lake Street exit off Interstate 35W. The district represents the most intact and concentrated example of Queen Anne style houses by a single builder in Minneapolis.

The majority of homes on this block were built by Theron P. Healy, a Minneapolis home builder. He moved to Minneapolis in 1884 and decided to capitalize on the rapidly growing areas of south Minneapolis, which had been made accessible by streetcars on Nicollet Avenue South and 31st Street. He was the only builder to concentrate on the Queen Anne style in Minneapolis, working between 1886 and 1898. He was a Master Builder, a builder who also designed the homes he built. In addition to building homes on this block, Healy built Queen Anne homes in the Lowry Hill area and elsewhere in south Minneapolis.

The Queen Anne style was popularized in the United States after the Centennial Exposition in Philadelphia in 1876. The characteristics of this style include front-facing or cross-gabled rooflines, multiple building materials, trellised balconies, triptychs, window embellishments and stained glass transoms. Healy's designs included these characteristics, but he often included additional details such as brightly colored art glass transoms, semicircular openings underneath the gables, or off-center entrances. While the houses share common Queen Anne characteristics, each of these houses has its own unique details.
