= Bennett-Kelly Farm =

Historic house in Maryland

- U.S. National Register of Historic Places
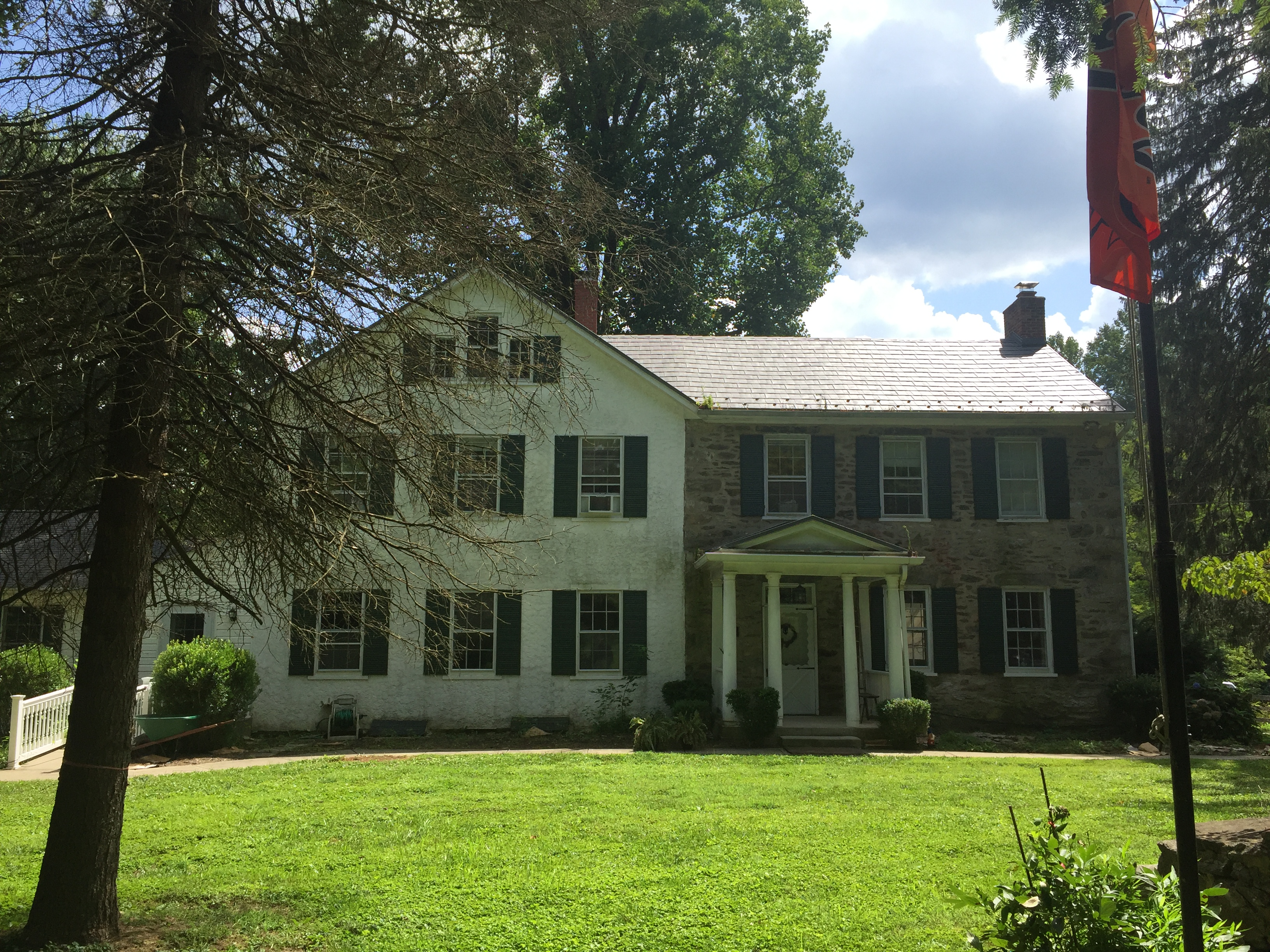

- Location within Maryland Location within the United States
- Location: 5842 Oakland Rd. Sykesville, Maryland
- Coordinates: 39°24′51″N 76°53′46″W
- Area: less than one acre
- NRHP reference No.: 04001378
- Added to NRHP: December 23, 2004

The Bennett-Kelly Farm is an historic home and farm complex located at Sykesville, Carroll County, Maryland, United States. The complex consists of a stone and frame house, a stone mounting block, a stone smokehouse, a frame bank barn, a frame wagon shed, a frame chicken house, a concrete block dairy or tool shed, and a stone spring house. The original mid-19th century stone section of the house is three bays wide and two stories high. The house features a one-bay Greek Revival pedimented portico with Doric columns. It is an example of a type of family farmstead that characterized rural agricultural Carroll County from the mid 19th century through the early 20th century.

The Bennett-Kelly Farm was listed on the National Register of Historic Places in 2004.
