= George Bennett House =

Historic house in Ohio, United States

- U.S. National Register of Historic Places
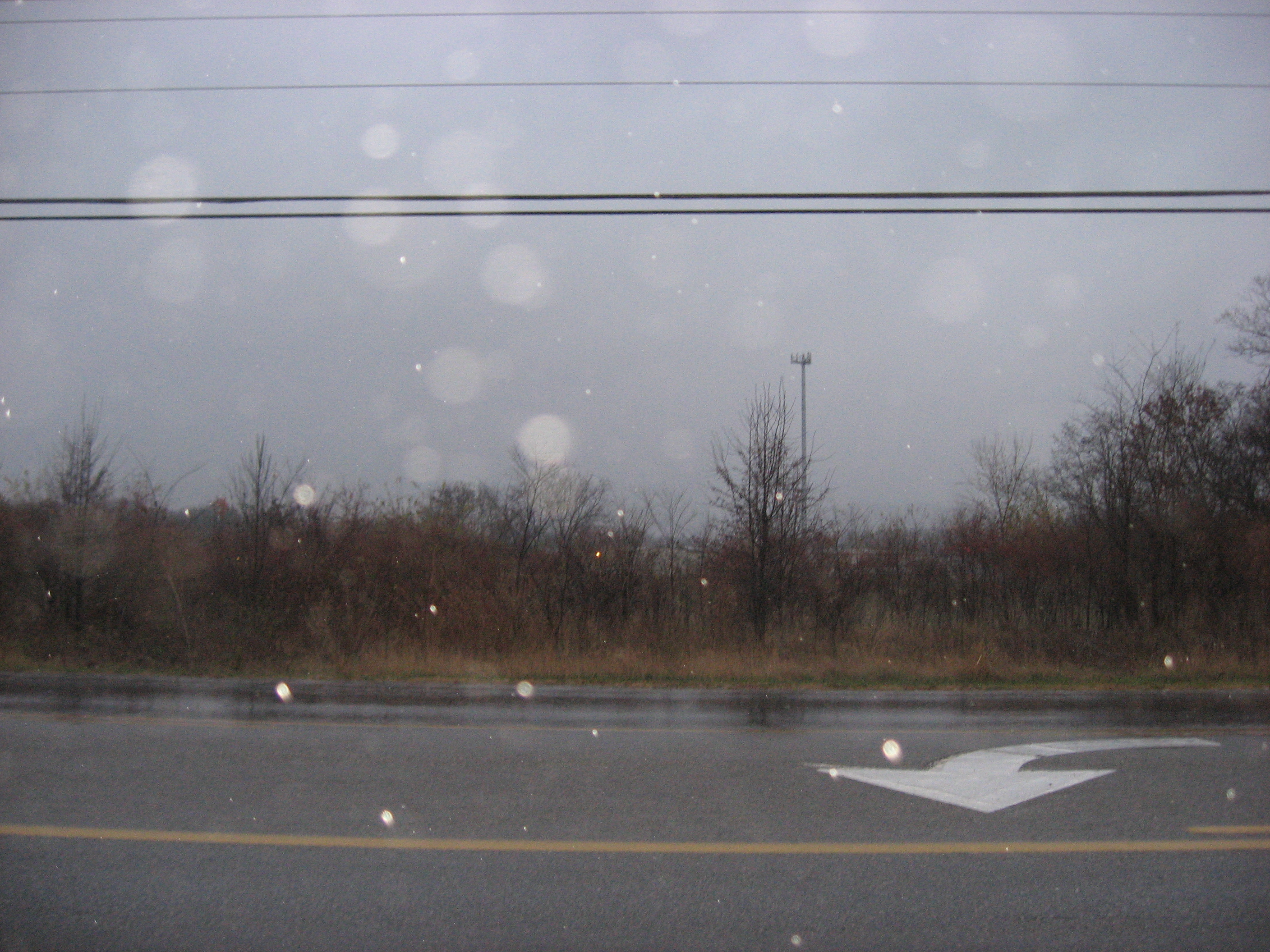
- Site of the Bennett House

- Location within Ohio Location within the United States
- Location: 10281 Harrison Pike, Harrison, Ohio
- Coordinates: 39°14′45″N 84°46′58″W
- Area: Less than 1 acre (0.40 ha)
- Built: 1847
- Architectural style: Greek Revival
- NRHP reference No.: 75001426
- Added to NRHP: May 29, 1975

The George Bennett House was a historic residence built near the city of Harrison, Ohio, United States. Constructed during the middle of the nineteenth century, it was a prominent building along one of the area's major roads, and it was eventually named a historic site.

George Bennett was among the first men of the Harrison area during the middle of the nineteenth century. Besides his wealth, which was equalled by few men in the area, his prominence derived from his politics: he gained a reputation as a premier lobbyist. Bennett also occupied a leading place in the society of northwestern Hamilton County, and his home was widely known for its numerous social gatherings as well as the political events that were held there. He arranged for the construction of his house in 1847, employing an unknown architect to produce a simple design in the Greek Revival style.

Two stories tall, the house was highly symmetrical, with a central section and a wing on each side of a size comparable to the center. All three segments of the facade were divided into three bays each, with the main entrance in the central bay of the central section. Each of the remaining seventeen openings was filled with a window, although the second-floor windows on the wings were substantially shorter than the windows of the central section and of the first-floor windows of the wings. Framing the ends of the building were two chimneys, with one on the roofline at each end of the house, while the center was marked by a simple four-pillared portico sheltering the entrance and permitting the central section of the house to have a substantial overhang. All roofs were gabled, and the projection at the center of the facade was topped with a pediment under the roof. Constructed on a stone foundation, the house was built with walls of mixed brick and wood, and in its last years, the house was given a tin roof. Bennett's frequent parties necessitated the reservation of a large space on the second floor for use as a ballroom, with its floor supported by springs according to oral tradition, although collapsible screens permitted its conversion into dormitory space when necessary. The overall plan bears similarities to various structures designed by Thomas Jefferson, but the Bennett House's adherence to the later Greek Revival style was solidified by its lack of complex design elements.

Due to its large size and distinctive architecture, which were accentuated by its location on the Harrison Pike, the Bennett House was long a landmark for local residents and travellers. In mid-1975, its status was further raised by addition to the National Register of Historic Places; qualifying because of its distinctive historic architecture, it was the first Harrison-area building to acquire this designation, although the Othniel Looker House was listed one week later, and four more houses followed by the end of 1976. Despite its landmark status, the house no longer occupies its place; the site is now an empty lot.
