= Gacy (film) =

- Film poster
- Directed by: Clive Saunders
- Screenplay by: David Birke; Clive Saunders
- Story by: Clive Saunders
- Produced by: Tim Swain; Larry Rattner
- Starring: Mark Holton; Charlie Weber; Glenn Morshower; Allison Lange; Edith Jefferson; Joleen Lutz; Jeremy Lelliot; John Laughlin
- Cinematography: Kristian Bernier
- Edited by: Jeff Orgill; Chryss Terry
- Music by: Erik Godal; Mark Fontana
- Production companies: Peninsula Films; DEJ Productions; Rillington Productions; Beartooth Productions
- Distributed by: Lionsgate Home Entertainment
- Release date: May 13, 2003 (United States)
- Running time: 88 minutes
- Country: United States
- Language: English

Gacy (also known as The Crawl Space) is a 2003 American crime horror biopic thriller film written and directed by Clive Saunders, and co-written by David Birke. A direct-to-video release, it is based on the crimes of John Wayne Gacy, an American serial killer who raped, tortured, and murdered at least thirty-three men and boys in the Chicago metropolitan area during the 1970s. The film stars actor Mark Holton, in his first lead role, as Gacy.

== Plot ==
In 1953, John Wayne Gacy argues with his father, John Stanley Gacy, who says he will "never be brave enough" and kicks him.

In 1976, the adult Gacy's lunch with his family is interrupted by a neighbor demanding something be done about the stench coming from his crawl space. Gacy responds angrily that he will. Lunch is interrupted again when Steve, an employee of Gacy's, complains he has not been paid for two weeks. Gacy says he will be paid and orders him off his property. Gacy consults a friend who advises lime for the smell.

While driving at night, Gacy abducts a man, brings him back to his garage and tells him about his problems, then releases him. At work Gacy angrily berates his workers for smoking on the job. He asks his latest employee how he is enjoying working for him, and if he likes wrestling. They wrestle in Gacy's back yard where Gacy pins him down and Steve, watching with another man, calls him a faggot. Gacy is furious.

The next day, Steve and two other men attack Gacy as he comes out of a shop. Steve takes the money from Gacy's wallet, gives some to the other men and tells Gacy that he has quit. Late that night, Gacy's wife, Kara, is awake in bed when she hears a car pull up. Gacy gets out and brings out Steve, who is handcuffed, and shoves him into the garage. Investigating, Kara finds clothes strewn about in the garage. She runs to the crawl space entrance where Gacy bursts out, saying that he had been laying down lime.

Gacy hosts his Fourth of July costume party, during which he offers Tom Kovak a job, and a speech is made honoring Gacy as an asset to the community. He hires an exterminator to take care of the maggots and cockroaches gathering in the crawl space. Questioned by two police officers about Steve's disappearance, he says Steve told him he was going to Costa Rica or Puerto Rico. One day, Gacy hits one of his employees over the head with a hammer. After cleaning him up, he pays him for his silence and lets him go. Kara discovers a pair of handcuffs and some homosexual magazines in the garage. Gacy blames some employees, saying "you know how I feel about homos". A few days later, Kara takes the two girls and leaves Gacy alone with his mother. Tom is having problems at home, so Gacy suggests he rent Gacy's spare room.

Another late evening, Gacy picks up a male prostitute and stuffs a chloroformed rag into his face. The prostitute awakens suspended by chains in Gacy's garage. The next morning, Gacy leaves the prostitute in the park where he stumbles away. Gacy lays concrete in the crawl space to try and cover the stench. He meets with James Burrel and agrees to buy his car. Inviting Burle in for a drink, he instead drowns him in the bathtub. Gacy is running out of room in the crawl space. As Gacy and Tom are watching a video reel of how Gacy started his business, the video cuts to pornography. Tom freaks out and spends the night awake and terrified.

Tom decides to leave, but Gacy tricks him into being handcuffed and starts strangling him. Tom manages to escape and runs to the police. While Gacy is out of the house the police enter and find dozens of watches and drivers licenses.

Gacy is arrested as the police exhume the bodies from the crawl space. The film ends with Gacy's last words before he's put to death. They are, "Kiss my ass!"

== Cast ==
- Mark Holton as John Wayne Gacy
- Adam Baldwin as John Stanley Gacy
- Tom Waldman as Hal
- Charlie Weber as Tom Kovak
- Allison Lange as Gretchen
- Edith Jefferson as Mother Gacy
- Joleen Lutz as Kara Gacy (based on Carole Hoff)
- Scott Allen Henry as Young John Wayne Gacy
- Kenneth Swartz as Dave
- Matt Farnsworth as Stu（based on Michael Rossi）
- Jeremy Lelliot as Steven Banasky
- Joseph Sikora as Roger (based on Jeffrey Rignall)
- Oren Skoog as James Burrel
- Joe Roncetti as Peter
- Eddie Adams as Duane
- Doran Ray as Tony Pasolini
- Larry Hankin as Eddie Bloom
- Rick Dean as Ray
- Glenn Morshower as Ted Boyle
- Jessica Schatz as Julie Boyle
- Mickey Swenson as Detective Ritzik
- Dan Bell as Detective Dunne
- John Laughlin as Detective Lieutenant Kay
- Steve Abbott as Officer Radclif Wolf
- David Manis as Officer Greg Bucholtz
- John Horn as Fred Getz
- Tina Preston as Meg Getz
- Shadi Dwait as Mr. Pasolini
- Jessica Hanamoto as Tammy Gacy
- Grace Hanamoto as April Gacy

== Reception ==
On the film review aggregate website Rotten Tomatoes, Gacy received a 17% approval rating, based on six reviews, with an average rating of 3.8/10. Chuck Wilson of LA Weekly found Gacy to be an "unenlightening" and "unconvincing" film that suffered from "dime-store psychology" and a failure to "convey the subtleties of Gacy’s scheming intellect." Mike Long of DVD Talk gave the film a half star out of a possible five, opined that it "offers no suspense, no gore, and no thrills" and concluded, "If nothing else, a film about a serial killer should offer a glimpse inside the criminal mind. If it can't do that, it could at least be an entertaining exploitation film. Gacy is neither of those things and there is absolutely no reason to see this movie." Reel Film Review's David Nusair commended Mark Holton's performance as Gacy, but lambasted the film itself, which he derided as being an ineptly written and directed "bore" that "completely fails to make any kind of impact." Conversely, Gacy was praised for its "dark, disturbing insight into Gacy" by Steve Barton of Dread Central, who went on to write that the "horrifying and informative" film was "well-worth seeking out to learn more about America's most notorious serial killer." Buzz McClain of AllMovie also praised the "ruthlessly fascinating" film, which he gave a score of 3/5.

== See also ==
- To Catch a Killer, a 1992 film about John Wayne Gacy
- Dear Mr. Gacy, a 2010 film about John Wayne Gacy
