= Devil in Disguise: John Wayne Gacy =

American true crime drama series

- Genre: True crime drama
- Created by: Patrick Macmanus
- Starring: Michael Chernus; Gabriel Luna; James Badge Dale; Michael Angarano; Chris Sullivan; Marin Ireland
- Country of origin: United States
- Original language: English
- No. of episodes: 8

Production
- Executive producers: Patrick Macmanus; Kelly Funke; Noah Oppenheim; Sarah Bremner; Liz Cole; Ashley Michel Hoban; Ahmadu Garba; Tom Sellitti Jr.; Larysa Kondracki
- Production companies: Littleton Road Productions; NBC News Studios; Universal Content Productions

Original release
- Network: Peacock
- Release: October 16, 2025

Devil in Disguise: John Wayne Gacy is an eight-episode, American true crime drama miniseries that premiered on October 16, 2025, on Peacock. It dramatizes the life and crimes of serial killer John Wayne Gacy, who murdered dozens of young men and boys during the 1970s. In the United Kingdom, the series premiered on ITVX in January 2026.

== Plot ==
The series examines the life of John Wayne Gacy, a respected community member who was convicted of sodomy after he sexually assaulted 15-year-old Donald Voorhees Jr., and who was later discovered to be a serial killer who raped, tortured and murdered at least thirty-three young men and boys between 1972 and 1978 in Norwood Park Township, a suburb of Chicago, Illinois. The series explores the investigation leading to his capture, the lives of his victims, and the grief their families endured. Beyond detailing Gacy's crimes, the series examines systemic failures, societal prejudices, and missed opportunities that allowed him to evade detection for years.

== Cast ==
- Michael Chernus as John Wayne Gacy
- Gabriel Luna as Det. Rafael Tovar
- James Badge Dale as Joe Kozenczak
- Michael Angarano as Sam Amirante
- Chris Sullivan as Bill Kunkle
- Marin Ireland as Elizabeth Piest, Rob's mother
- Augustus Prew as Jeffrey Rignall
- Brandon McEwan as Phillip Paske
- Ryker Baloun as Robert Piest
- Cricket Brown as Kerry Piest
- Thom Nyhuus as Kenneth Piest
- Quincy Tyler Bernstine as Dr. Healy (uncredited)
- Brenda Bazinet as Eugenia Godzik, Gregory's mother
- Ella Rae Peck as Rose Perino, Jeffrey's girlfriend
- R Austin Ball as Ron Dovenek, Jeffrey's partner
- Nina Kiri as Mary Amirante
- Étienne Kellici as Samuel Stapleton
- Sprague Grayden as Bessie Stapleton, Samuel's mother
- Mallory Bechtel as Mary Jane, Billy Kindred's girlfriend
- Levi Shelton as John 'Johnny' Szyc
- Max Mattern as Billy Carroll
- Brayden Raqueño as Dale Landingin
- Ianne Fields Stewart as Sophia St. Laurent
- Gavin Lewis as Timothy McCoy
- Eva Foote as Carol Gacy
- Crede Cooper as John Butkovich

== Production ==
Devil in Disguise: John Wayne Gacy is based on the similarly named 2021 Peacock docuseries John Wayne Gacy: Devil in Disguise. The 2025 series shifts focus from the killer himself to the impact on his victims and the investigation that brought him to justice. Showrunner Patrick Macmanus emphasized the importance of highlighting the victims rather than sensationalizing Gacy.

== Episodes ==
No.	Title	Directed by	Written by	Original release date
1	"Ten Days"	Larysa Kondracki	Patrick Macmanus	October 16, 2025
2	"Johnny"	Ashley Michel Hoban	Gregory Locklear	October 16, 2025
3	"Samuel and Randy"	Maggie Kiley	Matthew White	October 16, 2025
4	"Billy"	Maggie Kiley	Yasmin Almanaseer	October 16, 2025
5	"Billy and Dale"	Bille Woodruff	Sebastián Rea	October 16, 2025
6	"Tim, John and Rob"	Larysa Kondracki	Ashley Michel Hoban	October 16, 2025
7	"David"	Bille Woodruff	Ahmadu Garba	October 16, 2025
8	"Jeffrey"	Patrick Macmanus	Gregory Locklear & Matthew White	October 16, 2025

== Reception ==
On the review aggregator website Rotten Tomatoes, 96% of 23 critics' reviews are positive. The website's consensus reads, "Devil in Disguise: John Wayne Gacy offers a compassionate, morally clear reexamination of the infamous killer's crimes that honors victims and finds fresh purpose in retelling their stories." Metacritic, which uses a weighted average, assigned a score of 76 out of 100, based on 12 critics, indicating "generally favorable" reviews.

=== Accolades ===
Award	Date of ceremony	Category	Nominee(s)	Result	Ref.
Astra Creative Arts Awards	December 11, 2025	Best Hairstyling - Television	Devil in Disguise: John Wayne Gacy	Nominated	
Astra Creative Arts Awards	December 11, 2025	Best Main Title Design - Television	Devil in Disguise: John Wayne Gacy	Nominated	
Astra Creative Arts Awards	December 11, 2025	Best Makeup - Television	Devil in Disguise: John Wayne Gacy	Won	
Critics' Choice Television Awards	January 4, 2026	Best Limited Series	Devil in Disguise: John Wayne Gacy	Nominated	
Critics' Choice Television Awards	January 4, 2026	Best Actor in a Limited Series or Movie Made For Television	Michael Chernus	Nominated	
Critics' Choice Television Awards	January 4, 2026	Best Supporting Actress in a Limited Series or Movie Made For Television	Marin Ireland	Nominated	
