= 29 Below =

1979 biographical true crime book by Jeffrey Rignall and Ronald Wilder

- Cover of 29 Below, designed by Pat Happel
- Author: Jeffrey Rignall and Ronald Wilder
- Language: English
- Genre: Autobiography; true crime
- Publisher: Wellington Press
- Publication date: July 1979
- Publication place: United States
- Media type: Print (hardcover)
- Pages: 257
- ISBN: 0-363-03363-9
- OCLC: 6366698

29 Below (or 29 Below: An Encounter with John Wayne Gacy) is an autobiographical true crime book by Jeffrey Rignall and Ronald Wilder. It was ghostwritten by Patricia Colander.

29 Below was published in July 1979, the first book on the subject of then-recently apprehended serial killer John Wayne Gacy.

The book details Rignall's relationship struggles, his encounter with Gacy, and its aftermath. Its title refers to the twenty-nine victims discovered buried on Gacy's property.

== History ==
Jeffrey Rignall was a rape victim of serial killer John Wayne Gacy, one of an unknown number that occurred concurrently with his murder spree from 1972 to 1978.

After the book's publishing, Rignall would appear as a witness for Gacy's defense in 1980, stating his belief that Gacy was legally insane. After the trial, Rignall left the area permanently. He died in 2000, aged 49.

== Plot ==
In 1977, 26-year-old Jeffrey Rignall lives in Fort Lauderdale, Florida, with his partner, Ronald Wilder. The two are in business together and active in the city's gay scene. After some financial difficulties and growing stress in their relationship, Rignall decides to move back to Chicago, Illinois, to live with his friend and past lover, Dawn Lufka.

On the night of March 21, 1978, Rignall leaves his and Lufka's apartment following an argument, intending to walk to a nearby gay bar, and accepts a ride from an unfamiliar man. While on the road, the man sticks a rag with chloroform over Rignall's mouth, and he loses consciousness. Rignall comes to in a living room, where he is bound and raped by two men. The next morning, he wakes up beneath the Alexander Hamilton statue in Lincoln Park and returns to his apartment, where Lufka sympathizes and recalls the time she was raped. Police show little effort to locate the perpetrator, and Rignall takes the investigation into his own hands.

After hearing of what had occurred, Wilder moves to Chicago, and he and Rignall decide to stake out the exit ramp that the man had used the night of his assault. After weeks of waiting, they spot the black Oldsmobile and follow it home. Rignall writes down the home address and his license plate number and brings the information to the local deeds office, who inform him that the man is 36-year-old John Wayne Gacy. Gacy was a locally respected contractor who had previously served a prison sentence in Iowa for sodomy.

Now knowing the identity of his kidnapper, Rignall again reports the incident to police—yet nothing is done. Rignall contacts Fred Richman, an attorney and Lufka's ex-boyfriend, and they discover that other complaints were filed against Gacy in Chicago. Over the following months, Rignall's physical and mental health deteriorate. He and Wilder move out of Lufka's apartment, and she attempts suicide by overdosing on Valium.

Rignall sends a letter to Gacy announcing that he plans to pursue legal action. In July 1978, a battery charge is filed against Gacy by the state's attorney's office, but he remains free. Gacy files a counter-complaint alleging battery by Rignall. After Gacy sends a teenager to appear on his behalf in court, the counter-complaint is thrown out.

In December, twelve days before Rignall's case is scheduled to be resolved, Gacy is arrested for killing his 15-year-old part-time employee, Robert Piest, and he confesses to over thirty murders. Rignall corresponds with media and law enforcement and attends Gacy's arraignment. Deciding to get away from things for a while, Rignall and Wilder leave for a vacation.

== Publication ==
29 Below was published by Wellington Press. In July 1979, a release party was hosted in Chicago at the home of Patricia Colander, the book's ghostwriter, with Rignall, Wilder, and Richman present. Founder of the Chicago Reader, Robert A. Roth, also joined. Rignall told guests that he primarily wrote the book to capitalize on the incident.

It was priced at $8.95 and sold 5,000 copies, and a second printing run was planned.

=== Scarcity ===
The book is out of print as of 2021, and used copies typically go for hundreds of dollars by online resellers.
