= Polish Constitution Day Parade =

Parade in Chicago, US

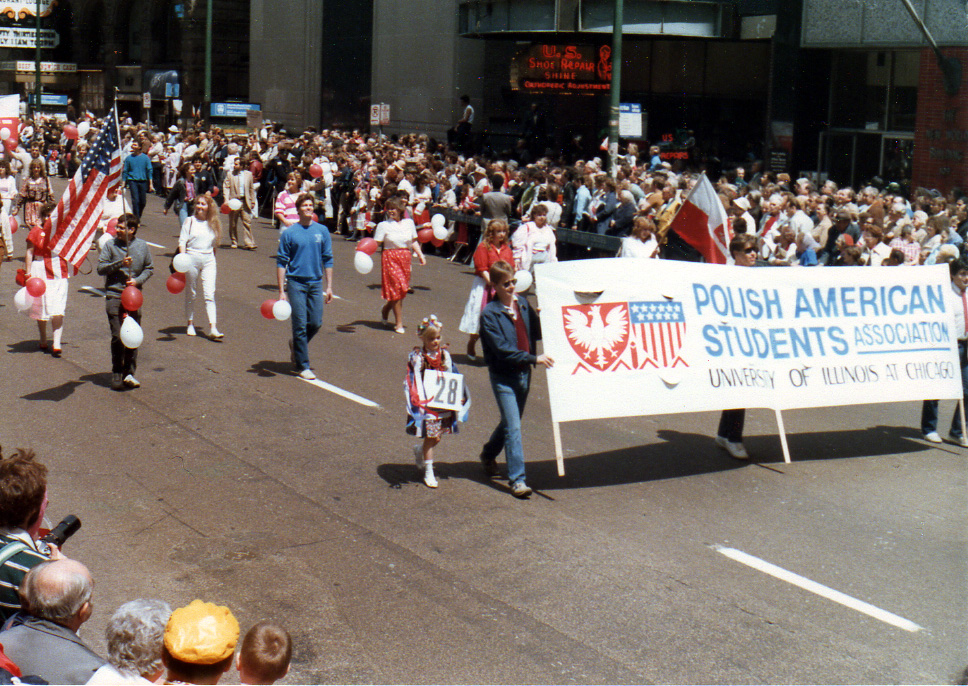
The Polish Constitution Day Parade in Chicago, 1985

The Polish Constitution Day Parade in Chicago is widely recognized as the largest Polish parade outside of Poland. It commemorates the anniversary of the ratification of the Polish Constitution of May 3, 1791, which established a constitutional monarchy with three separate branches of government—legislative, executive, and judicial—and extended political rights to the nobility, bolstering the role of the bourgeoisie, and granting protections to towns and peasantry. It remains the second-oldest written constitution in continuous commemoration, surpassed only by the United States Constitution.

In 1975, serial killer John Wayne Gacy (who was a local politician at the time) was appointed parade director, a position he held through 1978. During his tenure, Gacy met First Lady Rosalynn Carter on May 6, 1978; she later inscribed a photograph "To John Gacy. Best wishes. Rosalynn Carter." When news of his crimes emerged, the Secret Service faced embarrassment over the "S" pin Gacy had worn, indicating special clearance.

The parade is held each year on the Saturday closest to May 3. The route begins at Buckingham Fountain on Columbus Drive, proceeds north along Michigan Avenue, turns west at Monroe Street, then follows Dearborn to the bridge over the Chicago River, where the formal program—including the Grand Marshal's address and singing of both national anthems—takes place. Along the way, spectators line both sides of the street, festooned in Polish flags, waving copies of the May 3 Constitution text, and cheering for the marchers. By the early 2000s, the parade regularly featured over 100 distinct units and drew crowds estimated between 60,000 and 140,000 spectators, making it one of the largest annual public gatherings in downtown Chicago.

Local television and radio stations provide live coverage, with ABC7 Chicago offering both an on-site broadcast and on-demand access via its website. Polish-language radio stations and online streaming services also relay the event to listeners nationwide and abroad, allowing expatriates and viewers in Poland to share in the annual celebration.
