= Richard Kling =

American legal scholar

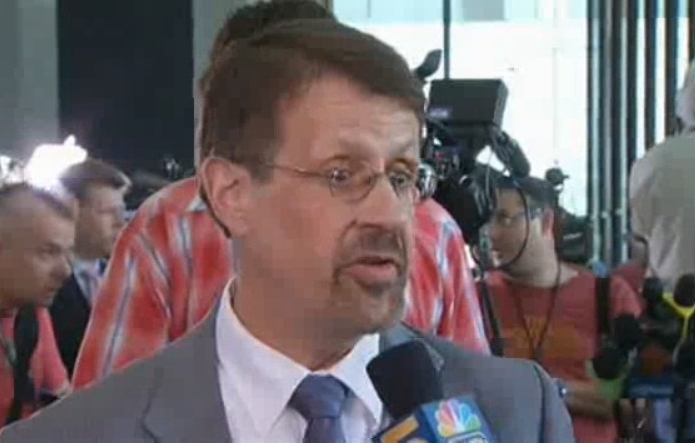
- Education: University of Illinois at Chicago (B.A.); Northwestern Law School (J.D.)
- Occupation: Clinical Professor of Law at the Chicago–Kent College of Law
- Website: Chicago-Kent College of Law Biography

Richard Kling is a Clinical Professor of Law at the Chicago–Kent College of Law in Chicago, Illinois, where he has been teaching since 1981. He teaches evidence, forensic science, and professional responsibility. He has personally tried over 500 jury trials, including 28 capital cases, and currently has a full-time Clinical Criminal practice through the Law Offices of the Chicago-Kent College of Law. Richard Kling is well respected in the Chicago legal community and is regularly featured in Chicago local news to discuss legal news topics ranging from the Rod Blagojevich corruption charges to the Drew Peterson murder trial.

== Professional biography ==
Richard Kling received his B.A, degree from the University of Illinois at Chicago and his J.D. degree in 1971 from Northwestern Law School. After graduating, he joined the Cook County Public Defender's Office, where he was a member of the Special Homicide Task Force. Before joining the faculty at Chicago-Kent College of Law, he taught trial advocacy at Northwestern Law School, taught an intensive attorney training program at the Illinois Defender's Project, and was a faculty member of the National Institute for Trial Advocacy.

Professor Kling regularly appears as a professor-reporter for the Administrative Office of the Illinois Courts. He also has co-directed and taught a course in professional responsibility for the Chicago Mercantile Exchange and the Chicago Board of Trade. He is a "public member" of the CME's Floor Practice Committee and an arbitrator for the National Futures Association.

Criminal Law and Procedure

Richard Kling is a prominent authority on Illinois state criminal procedure. He is a co-editor of a three-volume training manual for the Cook County Public Defender and he published Illinois Criminal Defense Motions in 1994, a manual of motions for Illinois criminal defense practitioners.

Evidence

Professor Richard Kling teaches Evidence at Chicago-Kent College of Law and has published many articles about evidence and discovery procedures, to include Pre-Trial Motions and Discovery and The Confrontation Clause and Illinois' Hearsay Exception for Child Sex Abuse Victims.

The Law Offices of Chicago-Kent

Richard Kling practices criminal defense litigation at the Law Offices of Chicago-Kent, one of the nation's largest in-house clinical programs, handling more than 1,000 cases annually.

== Notable cases ==
John Wayne Gacy

In 1986, Richard Kling was appointed to represent John Wayne Gacy for a post conviction petition. Gacy was an American serial killer and rapist, also known as the Killer Clown, who was convicted of the sexual assault and murder of a minimum of 33 teenage boys and young men in a series of killings committed between 1972 and 1978 in Chicago, Illinois. On appeal, Kling argued to the Supreme Court of Illinois that John Wayne Gacy had ineffective legal representation, however the Supreme Court denied the petition in 1988.

Suzanne Olds Murder Case

In 1995, Kling won an acquittal for Helmut Carsten Hofer in a sensational Chicago area murder case. Hofer was accused of murdering Suzanne Olds, a wealthy Wilmette socialite. Suzanne Olds was murdered in the garage of her Wilmette home while engaged in a bitter divorce with her husband Dean Olds, who was Hofer's mentor and lover. The acquittal was notable for its intense media coverage and unusual defense tactics.

Mel Reynolds

Mel Reynolds was born into a poor family in Mississippi, moved to Chicago when he was nine years old, went on to attend Yale University, graduated from the University of Illinois at Urbana-Champaign, and won a Rhodes Scholarship to attend the University of Oxford. Later on he received a degree from Harvard University. Reynolds soon ran for and was eventually elected to the United States House of Representatives. While a member of Congress representing the south side of Chicago and neighboring suburbs, Reynolds began having sex with an underage campaign worker. Eventually, Reynolds was prosecuted for criminal sexual abuse, obstruction of justice and solicitation of child pornography and convicted in 1995. Furthermore, during his campaigns in 1988, 1990, and 1992, Reynolds solicited illegal campaign contributions and violated various federal election laws. Reynolds, also while a member of Congress, initiated a fraudulent real estate transaction and obtained personal loans from banks through fraudulent misrepresentations. Subsequently, a federal grand jury indicted Reynolds for bank fraud and federal election law violations, and for obstruction of justice in connection with these crimes. A jury convicted Reynolds on 15 of the 16 counts in the federal indictment and the district court sentenced him to a 78-month prison term, and five years supervised release. Richard Kling represented Reynolds' in his appeal of federal convictions and sentence, which was affirmed by the United States Court of Appeals for the Seventh Circuit in 1999.

Herb Whitlock

In 1986, newlyweds Dyke and Karen Rhoads were murdered in Paris, Illinois, a small farming community in East Central Illinois. The murder was brutal; the newlyweds were repeatedly stabbed and their house was burned. Herbert Whitlock and Randy Steidl were later arrested and convicted for the murders. Steidl was convicted on both murder counts, and Whitlock was convicted of only killing Karen Rhoads. Steidl was sentenced to death, and Whitlock was sentenced to a life sentence. Both men appealed their convictions and claimed that they were innocent.

In 2000, the Illinois State Police reopened the case due to new evidence, with Lt. Michale Callahan leading the investigation. Callahan found numerous inconsistencies and evidence of misconduct that ultimately led him to conclude that the wrong men had been convicted of the murders. When he reported back to his superiors, he was told that the case was "too politically sensitive" and to drop the investigation. He later wrote a book, "Too Politically Sensitive," that chronicles his investigation and the eventual exoneration of Steidl and Whitlock. In 2003 United States District Judge Michael P. McCuskey, granted Steidl a Writ of Habeas Corpus and ordered a new trial for Steidl. The State chose not to bring Steidl to trial again and he was subsequently released in May 2004.

Richard Kling and Susana Ortiz, working with the Illinois Innocence Project, filed a postconviction petition on behalf of Herbert Whitlock, challenging the first degree murder conviction. Kling and Ortiz contended that the State suppressed favorable and material evidence to Whitlock, in violation of Brady v. Maryland, and that Whitlock had ineffective assistance of counsel during his trial. While the circuit court judge, H. Dean Andrews, denied the petition, citing res judicata and forfeiture, Kling and Ortiz appealed and the Fourth District Appellate Court of Illinois, in September 2007, reversed the circuit court judge and remanded Herbert Whitlock's murder case for a new trial. The State did not pursue a new trial and Whitlock was released in January 2008.

== Publications ==
Criminal Law and Procedure

- Illinois Criminal Defense Motions
  Richard S. Kling. Illinois Criminal Defense Motions. (Butterworth Legal Publishers, 1995).
- Defending Defendants Charged with Drug Offenses
  Richard S. Kling. Defending Defendants Charged with Drug Offenses (3 volume manual for Cook County Public Defender's Office), (1994).
- Motion Manual for Illinois Criminal Defense Attorneys
  Richard S. Kling. Motion Manual for Illinois Criminal Defense Attorneys, (1994).
- Training Manual for Cook County Public Defenders
  Richard S. Kling. Training Manual for Cook County Public Defenders (co-editor with J. Carey), (1993).
- Management of a Criminal Trial
  Richard S. Kling. Management of a Criminal Trial (Illinois Judicial Conference) (with L. Cavise) (1988).
- People v. Guzman: The Unconstitutionality of Illinois Mandatory Life Imprisonment Statute
  Richard S. Kling. People v. Guzman: The Unconstitutionality of Illinois Mandatory Life Imprisonment Statute 72 Illinois Bar Journal (1984): 248.
- Brady v. Maryland: Who was Brady, Anyway?
  Richard S. Kling. Brady v. Maryland: Who was Brady, Anyway? Illinois Defenders Digest (1981).

Evidence

- Pre-Trial Motions and Discovery
  Richard S. Kling. "Pre-Trial Motions and Discovery" Illinois Criminal Procedure 2d. (Ed. R. Ruebner ed., 1994)
- The Confrontation Clause and Illinois' Hearsay Exception for Child Sex Abuse Victims
  Richard S. Kling. The Confrontation Clause and Illinois' Hearsay Exception for Child Sex Abuse Victims 79 Illinois Bar Journal (1991): 560.
- Cross-Examination of Breath Alcohol Machine Operators
  Richard S. Kling. Cross-Examination of Breath Alcohol Machine Operators (with G. Sapir) 13 Southern Illinois University Law Journal (1988): 83.
- Handling Child Witnesses
  Richard S. Kling. Handling Child Witnesses (Illinois Judicial Conference) (with Marc R. Kadish) (1987).
- Pre-Trial Discovery, Illinois Criminal Procedure
  Richard S. Kling. "Pre-Trial Discovery" Illinois Criminal Procedure. (Butterworth Legal Publications, 1987).
- Pre-Trial Procedures and Practice, Illinois Criminal Procedure
  Richard S. Kling. "Pre-Trial Procedures and Practice" Illinois Criminal Procedure. (Ed. R. Ruebner ed., 1987).
- Expert Witness Testimony
  Richard S. Kling. Expert Witness Testimony (Illinois Judicial Conference) (1986).
- Illinois Law on Hearsay
  Richard S. Kling. Illinois Law on Hearsay (Illinois Judicial Conference) (with Marc R. Kadish) (1986).

Practice and Procedure

- Conduct Of A Jury Trial
  Richard S. Kling. Conduct Of A Jury Trial 3rd ed. (Illinois Judicial Conference) (with Marc R. Kadish) (1991).
