= Augustus Prew =

British actor (born 1987)

- Born: 17 September 1987 (age 38); Westminster, London, England
- Occupation: Actor
- Years active: 2001–present
- Spouse: Jeffery Self (m. 2018)

Augustus Prew (born 17 September 1987) is an English film and television actor. He is known for his roles in About a Boy (2002), The Secret of Moonacre (2008), Charlie St. Cloud (2010), The Borgias (2011), Kick-Ass 2 (2013), and Klondike (2014). He played Drew Jessup on the TV series 24Seven (2001–2002), James Bell on the CBS medical drama Pure Genius (2016–2017), and David "Whip" Martin on the Fox crime drama Prison Break (2017). In 2025, he performed the role of Good Boy in Jacob Wasson's play Smuta.

== Early life ==
Prew was born in Westminster, London, England, and is the son of Wendy Dagworthy, a fashion designer, and Jonathan W. Prew, a photographer.

== Personal life ==
Prew married fellow actor Jeffery Self on 13 January 2018 in Culver City, California.

== Filmography ==
Film and television roles
Year	Title	Role	Notes
2001–2002	24Seven	Drew Jessup	Various episodes
2002	About a Boy	Ali	
2003	The Bill	Jamie Heath	
2003	Spooks	Peter Ellis / Noah Gleeson	
2005	Marigold	Jack Moore	Television film
2007	The Time of Your Life	Dexter	
2008	Little Rikke	Karl (voice)	Television film
2008	The Secret of Moonacre	Robin de Noir	
2008	Silent Witness	Binyomin Marowski / Binyomin Marowsky	
2010	Charlie St. Cloud	Alistair Woolley	
2010	The Kid	Teen Kevin	
2010	Sophie	Blake	a.k.a. Sophie & Sheba
2011	The Borgias	Prince Alfonso	
2012	Hated	Joey	
2012	Animals	Ikari	
2013–2014	The Village	George Allingham	
2013	NCIS	Anton Markin	
2013	Copperhead	Ni	
2013	Kick-Ass 2	Todd Haynes/Ass-Kicker	Replaces Evan Peters
2014	Klondike	Byron Epstein	Miniseries; 3 episodes
2014	Major Crimes	Wade Weller	4 episodes
2016	High-Rise	Munrow	
2016	Chubby Funny	Charlie	
2016–2017	Pure Genius	James Bell	Lead role
2017	Prison Break	Whip	8 episodes
2018	Ibiza	Miles	
2019	Special	Carey	Main cast (season 1)
2019	Almost Love	Marklin	
2019–present	The Morning Show	Sean	Recurring role
2019	Into the Dark	Cameron	Episode: "Midnight Kiss"
2022	The Lord of the Rings: The Rings of Power	Médhor	
2023	Nolly	Tony Adams	
2023	Dear David	Adam Ellis	
2024	Players	Brannagan	
2025	1923	Paul	Season 2
2025	Devil in Disguise: John Wayne Gacy	Jeffrey Rignall	
