= Jeffrey Rignall =

American memoirist, John Wayne Gacy attack survivor (1951–2000)

- Rignall, c. 1970s
- Born: Jeffrey Douglas Rignall; August 21, 1951; Kalamazoo, Michigan, U.S.
- Died: December 24, 2000 (aged 49); Belleair Beach, Florida, U.S.
- Education: Western Kentucky University
- Known for: Surviving an attack by John Wayne Gacy
- Works: 29 Below
- Partner: Ron Wilder

Jeffrey Douglas Rignall (August 21, 1951 – December 24, 2000) was an American memoirist who wrote 29 Below about surviving a 1978 attack by serial killer John Wayne Gacy and his subsequent search to find his attacker. Rignall's testimony during Gacy's trial helped to secure the latter's conviction and death sentence. Rignall was profoundly affected both mentally and physically by the attack for the rest of his life. He died in 2000 at age 49.

== Biography ==
=== Early life ===
Rignall was born in Kalamazoo, Michigan. He attended Western Kentucky University in Bowling Green and then worked as a building renovator.

=== Attack by John Wayne Gacy ===
Rignall identified as bisexual and lived with his girlfriend as well as partner Ron Wilder, described by Rignall's attorney Fred R. Richman as a "live-in companion". While walking to a local gay bar in Rosemont, Illinois, on March 21, 1978, 26-year-old Rignall encountered Gacy, who lured Rignall into his car by offering him a ride and to smoke a joint with him. Gacy then held a rag soaked in chloroform over Rignall's mouth until he passed out. Rignall woke up intermittently during the car ride to Gacy's house and recognized a few landmarks but was chloroformed again and eventually lapsed into unconsciousness. Rignall said that when he awoke, he was inside Gacy's house. He was fastened to a torture device consisting of a wooden board laced with chains pinning Rignall's limbs. Gacy stood naked in front of him with an array of dildos and described in detail what he would do to Rignall with each of them. Gacy then brutally raped, drugged, whipped, and tortured Rignall. Rignall recalled that there was another man in the room while Gacy raped him and that the man had at one point performed oral sex on Rignall while he was bound. Rignall regained consciousness the next day under the Alexander Hamilton statue in Chicago's Lincoln Park. He made it back to his girlfriend's house, and she took him to Northwestern Memorial Hospital, where he stayed for six days. In the hospital, Rignall recounted his ordeal to the police, but they were skeptical of his story, and Rignall was unable to identify his assailant.

=== Aftermath of the attack ===
Rignall took on the investigation himself, staking out freeway exit ramps and overpasses in Northwest Chicago, looking for Gacy's black Oldsmobile. He eventually spotted Gacy, recorded his license plate number, and followed the car to Gacy's house in Norwood Park Township. Rignall provided police with the license plate number and address, but they did not act quickly on the information. Finally, in July 1978, the state's attorney's office filed a charge of battery against Gacy, but he was permitted to remain free. Rignall's case was never resolved in court. The battery charge was still pending in December 1978 when 15-year-old Robert Piest vanished in Des Plaines, Illinois, after encountering Gacy at the pharmacy where Piest worked. The Des Plaines police quickly settled on Gacy as a suspect and found Rignall's charge on Gacy's rap sheet. Investigators contacted Rignall, but before they were able to interview him, Gacy was arrested and confessed. Between the date that Rignall's battery charge was filed and the date of the Des Plaines arrest, Gacy had murdered four more young men, including Piest.

After Gacy's arrest, Rignall's assault charge against him was widely covered in the press. Other young men came forward with similar accounts, claiming that they had also been sexually assaulted or tortured by Gacy, while their reports to the Chicago police had been dismissed. The event, including recounting the experiences, affected Rignall greatly. He lost approximately 40 pounds, became severely withdrawn, and experienced depression and "bouts of vomiting." He began treatment for mental health concerns and was placed on tranquilizers and sleeping drugs. By February 1980, his medical expenses had ballooned to between $25,000 and $30,000.

Gacy was tried for murder in Chicago in 1980; Rignall appeared as a witness for the defense. Rignall supported the defense case by stating that, in his opinion, Gacy was not legally sane at the time of the attack, citing "...the beastly and animalistic ways he attacked me". Gacy never fully acknowledged his attack on Rignall—he described most of his sexual assaults as consensual encounters—and never explained why he released Rignall alive, but killed at least 33 other men and boys. Gacy was sentenced to death and was executed by lethal injection on May 10, 1994, at Stateville Correctional Center in Crest Hill.

=== 29 Below ===
Rignall partnered with Wilder and ghostwriter Patricia Colander to write a memoir of his experience with Gacy and his investigative attempts to find the rapist afterward. The book, published by Wellington Press and titled 29 Below, was released in 1979. Wellington Press released a description of the book:

"[29 Below is] the story in the year of the life of a young, gay man living in the New Town section of Chicago, the bittersweet tale of someone trying to find himself amidst the confusions and successes accompanying a search for sexual identity."

A book release party was held in Chicago in July 1979, where Rignall, Wilder, and Colander mingled with guests, one of whom was Robert A. Roth, publisher of the Chicago Reader. The book's first run sold through its 5,000 copies, and another release was planned. By 2021, the book was out of print and sold for hundreds of dollars on online retail platforms.

=== Later life ===
Approximately a year and a half after the attack, Rignall and Wilder moved to the Louisville, Kentucky, area so Rignall could escape the memories of what had happened to him. While in Louisville, he became reclusive and rarely left their apartment. He died in 2000 at age 49 in Belleair Beach, Florida.

== Bibliography ==
- Rignall, Jeff; Wilder, Ron. 29 Below. Wellington Press, 1979.

== Filmography ==
Documentaries
| Year | Title | Notes |
|---|---|---|
| 2019 | Very Scary People | Archival footage |
| 2021 | John Wayne Gacy: Devil in Disguise | Archival footage |
| 2022 | Conversations with a Killer: The John Wayne Gacy Tapes | Archival footage |

Television
| Year | Title | Notes |
|---|---|---|
| 1979 | The Late Late Show with Tom Snyder | Interview, February 16, 1979 |

Portrayals
| Year | Title | Notes |
|---|---|---|
| 2025 | Devil in Disguise: John Wayne Gacy | E8 "Jeffrey"; played by Augustus Prew |
