= John Wayne Gacy =

American serial killer (1942–1994)

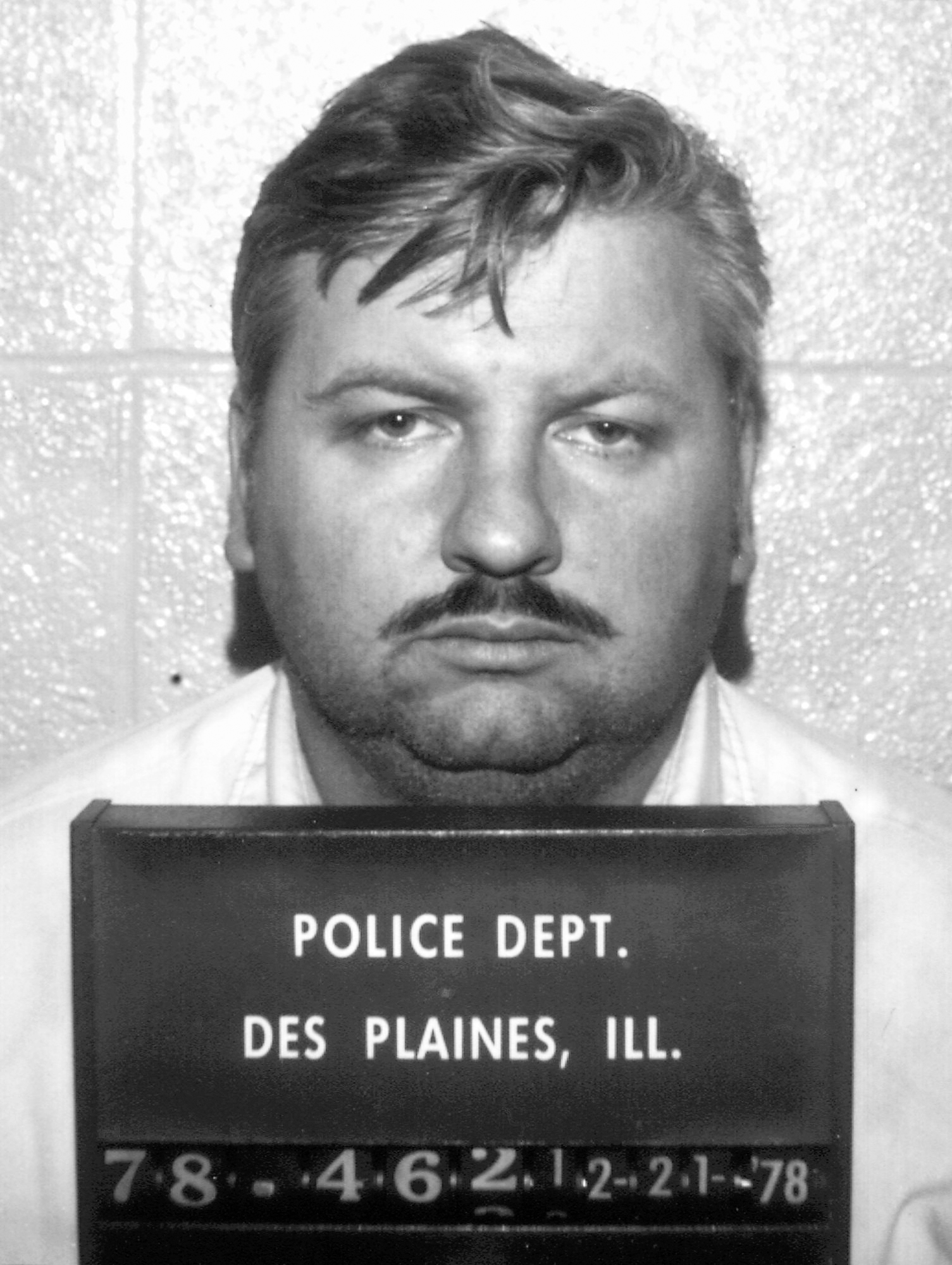
- 1978 mugshot of Gacy
- Born: March 17, 1942; Chicago, Illinois, U.S.
- Died: May 10, 1994 (aged 52); Stateville Correctional Center, Illinois, U.S.
- Other name: The Killer Clown
- Spouses: Marlynn Myers (m. 1964; div. 1969); Carole Hoff (m. 1972; div. 1976)
- Children: 2
- Status: Executed by lethal injection
- Convictions: Iowa; Sodomy; Illinois; Murder (33 counts); Indecent liberties with a child Deviate sexual assault
- Penalty: Death

Details
- Victims: 33+
- Span of crimes: 1972–1978
- Country: United States
- States: Illinois; Iowa
- Date apprehended: December 21, 1978
- Imprisoned at: Anamosa State Penitentiary (Iowa); Menard Correctional Center (Illinois)

John Wayne Gacy (March 17, 1942 – May 10, 1994) was an American serial killer and sex offender who raped, tortured and murdered at least thirty-three young men and boys between 1972 and 1978 in Norwood Park Township, a suburb of Chicago, Illinois. He became known as the "Killer Clown" due to his public performances as a clown prior to the discovery of his crimes.

Gacy committed all of his known murders inside his ranch-style house. Typically, he would lure a victim to his home and dupe them into donning handcuffs on the pretext of demonstrating a magic trick. He would then rape and torture his captive before killing his victim by either asphyxiation or strangulation with a garrote. Twenty-six victims were buried in the crawl space of his home, and three were buried elsewhere on his property; four were discarded in the Des Plaines River.

Gacy had previously been convicted in 1968 of sodomizing a teenage boy in Waterloo, Iowa, and was sentenced to ten years' imprisonment, but served eighteen months. He murdered his first victim in 1972, had murdered twice more by the end of 1975, and murdered at least thirty victims after his divorce from his second wife in 1976. The investigation into the disappearance of Des Plaines teenager Robert Piest led to Gacy's arrest on December 21, 1978.

Gacy's conviction for thirty-three murders then covered the most homicides by one individual in United States legal history. Gacy was sentenced to death on March 13, 1980. He was executed by lethal injection at Stateville Correctional Center on May 10, 1994.

== Early life ==
=== Childhood ===
John Wayne Gacy was born at Edgewater Hospital in Chicago, Illinois, on March 17, 1942, the second of three children and only son of John Stanley Gacy and Marion Elaine Robison. His father was an auto repair machinist and World War I veteran, and his mother was a homemaker. Gacy was of Polish and Danish ancestry, and his family identified as Catholic.

Gacy was close to his mother and two sisters but had a difficult relationship with his alcoholic father, who was verbally and physically abusive to his family. (Note: Gacy's father would drink alone in the family basement almost every evening before dinner, where his family would frequently hear him talking aloud to himself or holding imaginary conversations with friends who had died in World War I.) The elder Gacy frequently belittled his son, calling him "dumb and stupid" and comparing him unfavorably with his sisters. One of Gacy's earliest childhood memories was of his father beating him at age four for accidentally disarranging car engine components. His mother tried to shield her son from his father's abuse, which resulted in accusations that he was a "sissy" and a "mama's boy" who would "probably grow up queer".

In 1949, Gacy's father whipped him after he and another boy were caught sexually fondling a young girl. The same year, a family friend began to molest Gacy. Gacy never told his father, afraid that his father would blame him. Despite their dysfunctional relationship, Gacy loved his father, but felt he was "never good enough" in his father's eyes.

Gacy was an overweight and unathletic child. Because of a heart condition, he was told to avoid sports. In the fourth grade, Gacy began to experience blackouts. He was hospitalized on occasion because of these episodes and also, in 1957, for a burst appendix. Gacy later estimated that between the ages of 14 and 18, he had spent almost a year in hospital; he attributed the decline of his grades to missing school. (Note: Gacy attended Cooley Vocational High School, but transferred to Prosser Vocational High School after one year. He dropped out of school midway through his sophomore year.) Gacy's medical condition was never conclusively diagnosed; his father suspected he was malingering. On one occasion, he openly accused his son of faking as he lay in a hospital bed.

=== Career origins ===
In 1960, at age 18, Gacy became involved in politics, working as an assistant precinct captain for a local Democratic Party candidate. This led to more criticism from his father, who called him a "patsy". The same year, Gacy's father bought him a car. He kept the vehicle's title in his own name until Gacy had paid for it, which took several years. His father would confiscate the keys if Gacy did not do as he said. In April 1962, Gacy purchased an extra set of keys; in response, his father removed the distributor cap, keeping the component for three days. Hours after his father replaced the cap, Gacy left home and drove to Las Vegas, Nevada, with $136 to his name in the hope of residing with a cousin.

Gacy worked in the Las Vegas ambulance service before being transferred to Palm Mortuary. He worked as a mortuary attendant for three months, observing morticians embalming bodies and occasionally serving as a pallbearer. He slept on a cot behind the embalming room and later confessed that one evening, while alone, he clambered into the coffin of a teenage male, embracing and caressing the body before experiencing a sense of shock. (Note: Gacy later claimed to have engaged in acts of necrophilia twice while he worked at Palm Mortuary. He claimed the bodies were "just dead things" who "couldn't tell anybody".) This experience prompted Gacy to return home.

Shortly thereafter, Gacy enrolled at Northwestern Business College, despite having failed to complete high school. He graduated in 1963 and took a management trainee position with the Nunn-Bush Shoe Company. In 1964, the company transferred him to Springfield, Illinois, to work as a salesman, and eventually promoted him to department manager. In March of that year, he became engaged to Marlynn Myers, a co-worker.

During their courtship, Gacy joined the local chapter of the Jaycees, to whom he frequently devoted time and effort to community and fundraising projects. That same year, he had his second homosexual experience. According to Gacy, a colleague in the Jaycees plied him with drinks and invited him to spend the evening on his sofa; the colleague then performed oral sex on him while he was drunk. By 1965, Gacy had risen to the position of vice-president of the Springfield Jaycees and was named the third-most outstanding Jaycee in Illinois.

== Waterloo, Iowa ==
=== KFC manager ===
Gacy and Myers married in September 1964. Marlynn's father subsequently purchased three Kentucky Fried Chicken (KFC) restaurants in Waterloo, Iowa. The couple relocated there so Gacy could manage the restaurants, with the understanding that they would move into Marlynn's parents' former home. The offer was lucrative: Gacy would receive $15,000 per year (the equivalent of about $156,800 as of 2026), plus a share of the restaurant's profits.

Gacy opened a "club" in his basement where his employees could drink alcohol and play pool. Although Gacy employed teenagers of both sexes, he socialized only with the males. Gacy gave many of them alcohol before he made sexual advances; if they rebuffed him, he would claim his advances were jokes or a test of morals.

In February 1966, Gacy's wife gave birth to a son; a daughter was born in March 1967. Gacy later described this period of his life as "perfect"—he had finally earned his father's approval. When Gacy's parents visited him in July 1966, his father privately apologized for the abuse he had inflicted throughout his childhood and adolescence before happily saying, "Son, I was wrong about you" as he shook Gacy's hand.

=== Waterloo Jaycees ===
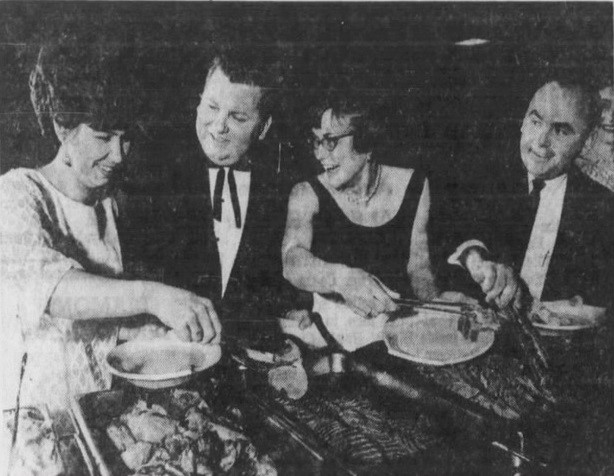
Gacy (second left), pictured with his first wife (far left) at the 1967 Waterloo Jaycees Christmas party

In Waterloo, Gacy joined the local Jaycees chapter, regularly offering extended hours to the organization in addition to the twelve- and fourteen-hour days he worked managing the restaurants. At meetings, Gacy often provided fried chicken and insisted on being called "Colonel". He and other Waterloo Jaycees were also deeply involved in drug abuse, pornography, prostitution and wife swapping. Although Gacy was considered ambitious and a braggart, the Jaycees held him in high regard for his fundraising work: in 1967 he was named "outstanding vice-president" of the Waterloo Jaycees and served on the board of directors.

==== Assault of Donald Voorhees ====
In August 1967, Gacy sexually assaulted 15-year-old Donald Voorhees Jr., the son of Donald Edwin Voorhees, a local politician and fellow Jaycee. Gacy lured Voorhees to his house with the promise of showing him heterosexual stag films regularly played at Jaycee events. Gacy plied Voorhees with alcohol, allowed him to watch a stag movie, then persuaded him to engage in mutual oral sex, adding, "You have to have sex with a man before you start having sex with women."

Over the following months, Gacy abused several other youths, including one whom he encouraged to have sex with his own wife before blackmailing him into performing oral sex on him. Gacy also tricked several teenagers into believing he was commissioned to conduct homosexual experiments for scientific research and paid them up to $50 each.

In March 1968, Voorhees told his father that Gacy had sexually assaulted him. Voorhees Sr. immediately informed the police, who arrested Gacy and charged him with performing oral sodomy on Voorhees and the attempted assault of 16-year-old Edward Lynch. Gacy vehemently denied the charges and demanded to take a polygraph test. The results of these tests were "indicative of deception". Gacy publicly denied any wrongdoing and insisted the charges were politically motivated—Voorhees Sr. had opposed Gacy's nomination for appointment as president of the Iowa Jaycees. Several fellow Jaycees found Gacy's story credible and rallied to his support. However, on May 10, 1968, Gacy was indicted on the sodomy charge.

"The most striking aspect of the test results is the patient's total denial of responsibility for everything that has happened to him. He can produce an "alibi" for everything. He presents himself as a victim of circumstances and blames other people who are out to get him ... the patient attempts to assure a sympathetic response by depicting himself as being at the mercy of a hostile environment."

— Section of report detailing Gacy's 1968 psychiatric evaluation.

On August 30, Gacy promised one of his employees, 18-year-old Russell Schroeder, $300 if he physically assaulted Voorhees in an effort to discourage the boy from testifying in court. Schroeder lured Voorhees to an isolated park, sprayed Mace in his eyes, then beat him.

Voorhees escaped and reported Schroeder's actions to the police. Schroeder was arrested the next day; initially denying involvement, he soon confessed to assaulting Voorhees, indicating he had done so at Gacy's request. Police arrested Gacy and charged him with hiring Schroeder to assault and intimidate Voorhees.

On September 12, Gacy was ordered to undergo a psychiatric evaluation at the Psychiatric Hospital of the University of Iowa. Two doctors concluded he had an antisocial personality disorder (the clinical term for sociopathy or psychopathy), was unlikely to benefit from treatment, and that his behavior pattern was likely to bring him into repeated conflict with society. The doctors concluded Gacy was mentally competent to stand trial.

== First conviction and imprisonment ==
On November 7, 1968, Gacy pleaded guilty to one count of sodomy in relation to Voorhees, but not guilty to the charges related to other youths. He claimed Voorhees had offered himself to him and that he had acted out of curiosity. His story was not believed. Gacy was convicted of sodomy on December 3 and sentenced to ten years' imprisonment, to be served at the Anamosa State Penitentiary. That same day, Gacy's wife petitioned for divorce, requesting she be awarded the couple's home and property, sole custody of their two children, and alimony. The court ruled in her favor, and the divorce was finalized on September 18, 1969. Gacy never saw his first wife or children again.

During his incarceration, Gacy rapidly acquired a reputation as a model prisoner. Within months of his arrival, he had risen to the position of head cook. He also joined the inmate Jaycee chapter and increased its membership from 50 to 650 men in less than eighteen months. Gacy secured an increase in the inmates' daily pay in the prison mess hall and supervised several projects to improve conditions for inmates, including the installation of a miniature golf course; he was presented with a distinguished service award for his efforts within the inmate Jaycee chapter in February 1970.

In June 1969, Gacy was denied parole. To prepare for a second scheduled parole hearing in May 1970, he completed sixteen high school courses, obtaining his diploma in November 1969. On Christmas Day 1969, Gacy's father died from cirrhosis. When informed of his father's death, Gacy collapsed to the floor, sobbing. His request for supervised compassionate leave to attend the funeral was denied.

== Return to Illinois ==
Gacy was granted parole with twelve months' probation on June 18, 1970, having served eighteen months of his ten-year sentence. Conditions of his probation included a nightly curfew and that Gacy relocate to Chicago to live with his mother. On his release, Gacy told friend and fellow Jaycee Clarence Lane—who picked him up from the prison and had remained steadfast in his belief of Gacy's innocence—that he would "never go back to jail" and that he intended to re-establish himself in Waterloo. However, within twenty-four hours, Gacy relocated to Chicago. He arrived there by bus on June 19 and shortly thereafter obtained a job as a short-order cook.

On February 12, 1971, Gacy was charged with sexually assaulting a teenage boy who claimed that he had lured him into his car at Chicago's Greyhound bus terminal and driven him to his home, where he had attempted to force the boy into sex. The court dismissed this complaint when the boy failed to appear. On June 22, Gacy was arrested and charged with aggravated sexual battery and reckless conduct, in response to a complaint filed by a youth who claimed that Gacy had flashed a sheriff's badge, lured him into his car, and forced him to perform oral sex. These charges were dropped after the complainant attempted to blackmail Gacy. The Iowa Board of Parole did not learn of these incidents. Gacy's parole ended on October 18, 1971, and a month later the records of Gacy's criminal convictions in Iowa were sealed. (Note: Gacy successfully hid his criminal record from friends, neighbors, business associates and political acquaintances; they only learned of his past after the police began investigating him for his later murders.)

=== 8213 West Summerdale Avenue ===
With financial assistance from his mother, Gacy bought a ranch-style house at 8213 West Summerdale Avenue in unincorporated Norwood Park Township, Illinois, part of metropolitan Chicago. He lived there until his arrest in December 1978 and, according to Gacy, committed all his murders there.

Gacy was active in his local community and helpful towards his neighbors; he willingly loaned his construction tools and plowed snow from neighborhood walks free of charge. From 1974 to 1978, he hosted themed annual summer parties. These events were attended by up to 400 people, including neighbors, politicians and business associates.

=== Second marriage and divorce ===
In August 1971, shortly after Gacy and his mother moved into the house, he became engaged to Carole Hoff, whom he had briefly dated in high school. Hoff and her two young daughters from a previous marriage moved into the house soon after. They were married on July 1, 1972. Gacy's mother moved out of the house shortly before the wedding.

By 1975, Gacy had told his wife that he was bisexual. After the couple had sex on Mother's Day that year, he informed her this would be "the last time" they would do so. He began spending most evenings away from home, only to return in the early morning with the excuse he had been working late or conducting business meetings. (Note: Carole would later state that during their marriage, Gacy "rarely" slept more than two hours per night.) Carole observed Gacy bringing teenage boys into his garage in the early hours and also found gay pornography and men's wallets and identification inside the house. When she confronted Gacy about these items, he informed her angrily that it was none of her business.

In October 1975, after a heated argument, Carole asked Gacy for a divorce. He agreed, although by mutual consent she continued to live at his house until February 1976. On March 2, the Gacys' divorce—decreed on the false grounds of Gacy's infidelity with women—was finalized. (Note: Hoping to reconcile, Gacy and Carole began dating again in late 1977, but she became engaged to another man the following year.)

=== PDM Contractors ===
In 1971, Gacy established a part-time construction business, PDM Contractors (for "Painting, Decorating, and Maintenance"). With the approval of his probation officer, Gacy worked evenings on his construction contracts while working as a cook during the day. Initially, he undertook minor repair work, but later expanded to include projects such as interior design, remodeling, and landscaping. In mid-1973, Gacy quit his job as a cook so he could commit fully to his construction business.

By 1975, PDM was expanding rapidly, and Gacy was working up to sixteen hours per day. In March 1977, he became a supervisor for PE Systems, a firm specializing in the remodeling of drugstores. Between PE Systems and PDM, Gacy worked on up to four projects simultaneously and frequently traveled to other states. By 1978, PDM's annual revenue was over $200,000 (the equivalent of about $1,024,000 as of 2026). (Note: In September 1978, Gacy was also appointed as vice president of RaphCo Incorporated, a contracting firm owned by a business associate.)

==== Clown ====
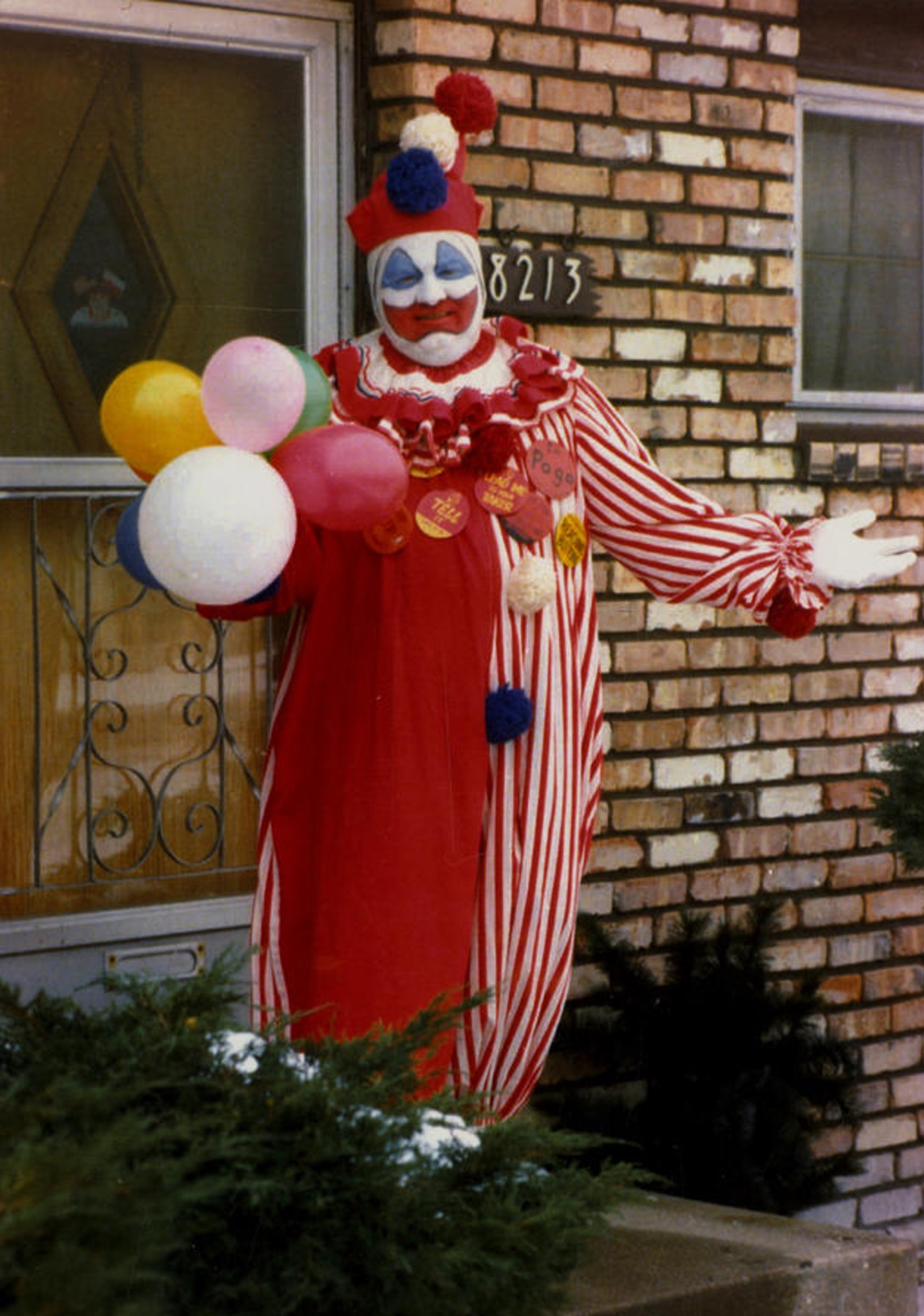
Gacy as Pogo the Clown

Through his membership in a local Moose Club, Gacy became aware of a "Jolly Joker" clown club, whose members regularly performed at fundraising events and parades in addition to voluntarily entertaining hospitalized children. In late 1975, Gacy joined the clown club and created his own characters "Pogo the Clown" and "Patches the Clown", devising his own makeup and costumes. He described Pogo as a "happy clown", whereas Patches was a "more serious" character.

Gacy seldom earned money for his performances and later said that acting as a clown allowed him to "regress into childhood". He performed as both Pogo and Patches at numerous local parties, political functions, charitable events, and children's hospitals. Gacy's voluntary public service as a clown throughout the years of his murders led to him being known as the "Killer Clown".

==== Employees ====
Much of PDM's workforce consisted of high school students and young men. Gacy would often proposition his workers for sex, or insist on sexual favors in return for lending his vehicles, financial assistance or promotions. Gacy also claimed to own guns, once telling an employee, "Do you know how easy it would be to get one of my guns and kill you—and how easy it would be to get rid of the body?"

In 1973, Gacy and a teenage employee traveled to Florida to view a property Gacy had purchased; while there, Gacy raped the employee in their hotel room. After returning to Chicago, this employee drove to Gacy's house and beat him in his front yard. Gacy told his wife he had been attacked for refusing to pay him for poor quality painting work.

In May 1975, Gacy hired 15-year-old Anthony Antonucci. Two months later, he went to Antonucci's home, knowing the youth had an injured foot. The two drank a bottle of wine, then watched a heterosexual stag film before Gacy wrestled Antonucci to the floor and cuffed his hands behind his back. One cuff was loose and Antonucci freed his arm while Gacy was out of the room. When Gacy returned, Antonucci—a high school wrestler—grappled with him, obtained the key, and cuffed Gacy's hands behind his back. Gacy threatened Antonucci, then calmed down and promised to leave if he was freed. Antonucci agreed and Gacy left. Antonucci continued working for PDM for nine months after this incident, and Gacy made no further attempts to assault him.

On July 26, 1976, Gacy picked up 18-year-old hitchhiker David Cram and offered him a job with PDM; he began work the same evening. On August 21, Cram moved into Gacy's house. The next day, Cram and Gacy had several drinks to celebrate his 19th birthday, with Gacy dressed as Pogo. Gacy tricked Cram into donning handcuffs, his wrists cuffed in front of his body rather than behind. He swung Cram around while holding the chain linking the cuffs, then said he intended to rape him. Cram kicked Gacy in the face and freed himself.

A month later, Gacy appeared at Cram's bedroom door, intending to rape him, saying, "Dave, you really don't know who I am. Maybe it would be good if you give me what I want." Cram resisted, straddling Gacy, who left the bedroom, stating, "You ain't no fun." Cram moved out on October 5 and left PDM, although he periodically worked for Gacy over the following two years. Shortly afterwards, another employee, 18-year-old Michael Rossi, moved in. Rossi had worked for PDM since May 23, 1976. He lived with Gacy until April 1977. (Note: The same month, Gacy became engaged to a woman he had been dating for three months, who moved into his house. In June of that year, by mutual agreement, the engagement was called off and she moved out.) Rossi sometimes assisted Gacy in clowning at grand openings of businesses: Gacy as Pogo and Rossi as Patches.

==== Politics ====
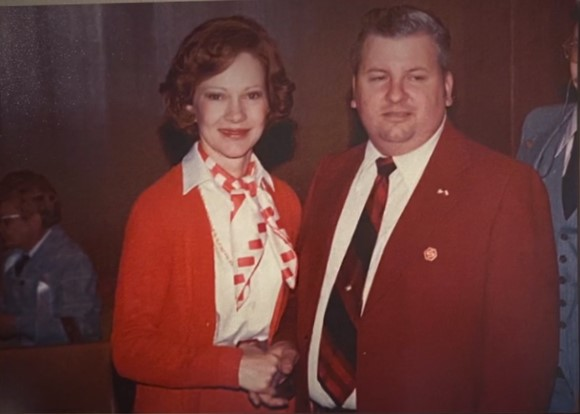
Gacy with First Lady Rosalynn Carter on May 6, 1978, six years after his first murder and seven months before his final arrest

Gacy entered local Democratic Party politics, initially offering the use of his employees to clean party headquarters at no charge. He was rewarded with an invitation to serve on the Norwood Park Township street lighting committee, subsequently earning the title of precinct captain.

In 1975, Gacy was appointed director of Chicago's annual Polish Constitution Day Parade. Through his work with the parade, which he would supervise until 1978, Gacy met and was photographed with First Lady Rosalynn Carter wearing an "S" pin, indicating a person given special clearance. The event later became an embarrassment to the United States Secret Service.

== Murders ==
Gacy murdered at least thirty-three young men and boys, twenty-six of whom he buried in the crawl space of his house. His victims included people he knew and strangers lured from Chicago's Greyhound Bus station, Bughouse Square, or off the streets with the promise of a job with PDM, an offer of alcohol, drugs, or money for sex. Some victims were grabbed by force; others were conned into believing Gacy (who often carried a sheriff's badge and had red spotlights on his black Oldsmobile) was a policeman. Gacy usually lured a lone victim to his house, although on more than one occasion Gacy had what he called "doubles"—two killed in the same evening.

Inside Gacy's home, his usual modus operandi was to ply a youth with drink, drugs, or generally gain his trust. He would then produce a pair of handcuffs to "show a magic trick," sometimes as part of a clowning routine. (Note: Prior to restraining some of his later victims, Gacy cryptically referred to his ultimate intention to murder his intended victim as he discussed and demonstrated innocuous clowning acts by stating he stored clowning "trophies" in his crawl space.) He typically cuffed his own hands behind his back, then surreptitiously released himself with a hidden key. He then offered to show his intended victim the trick. With his victim restrained, Gacy proceeded to rape and torture his captive. He referred to this ruse as "the handcuff trick".

Gacy frequently began by sitting on or straddling his victim's chest before forcing the victim to fellate him. He then inflicted acts of torture including burning with cigars, making his captive imitate a horse as he sat on their back and pulled on makeshift reins around their necks, and violation with foreign objects such as dildos and prescription bottles after he had sodomized his captive. Gacy frequently manacled his captives' ankles to a two-by-four with handcuffs attached at each end, an act inspired by the Houston Mass Murders. (Note: Dean Corll, with two teenage accomplices, had used a board fitted with handcuffs at each corner to restrain teenage male victims during sexual abuse and torture. Several of Corll's victims were also duped into donning handcuffs prior to their restraint.) He also taunted many victims throughout their abuse, and was known to have partly drowned several in the bathtub before repeatedly reviving them.

Gacy typically murdered his victims by placing a rope tourniquet around their neck and progressively tightening it with a hammer handle. He referred to this as the "rope trick", frequently informing his victim, "This is the last trick." Occasionally, the victim convulsed for an "hour or two" before dying, although several victims died by asphyxiation from cloth gags stuffed deep in their throats. Except for his two final victims, all were murdered between 3:00 and 6:00 a.m. Gacy usually stored the victims' corpses under his bed for up to twenty-four hours before burying them in the crawl space, where he periodically poured lime to hasten decomposition. (Note: Some investigators believe that Gacy engaged in acts of necrophilia with his victims.) Some were taken to his garage and embalmed prior to burial.

=== Murder of Timothy McCoy ===
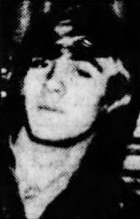
Timothy McCoy

Gacy's first known murder occurred on January 3, 1972. According to Gacy's later account, following a family party the previous evening, he drove to the Civic Center in the Loop in the early morning to view a display of ice sculptures. He then lured 16-year-old Timothy Jack McCoy from Chicago's Greyhound Bus Terminal into his car. McCoy was on his way to his father's home in Omaha, Nebraska, and informed Gacy his bus was not due until noon that day. Gacy took McCoy on a sightseeing tour of Chicago and then drove him to his home with the promise that he could spend the remainder of the night and be driven back to the station in time to catch his bus. (Note: Gacy's fiancée and stepdaughters were visiting relatives in Kennicott Grove at the time of this first murder.) Prior to McCoy's identification, he was known as the "Greyhound Bus Boy".

Gacy claimed he woke early the following morning to find McCoy standing in his bedroom doorway holding a kitchen knife. He jumped from his bed and McCoy raised both arms in a gesture of surrender, accidentally cutting Gacy's forearm. (Note: Gacy had a scar on his arm to support this account.) Gacy disarmed McCoy, banged his head against the bedroom wall, and kicked him against his wardrobe. McCoy kicked Gacy in the stomach, doubling him over. Gacy then grabbed McCoy, wrestled him to the floor and stabbed him repeatedly in the chest.

As McCoy lay dying, Gacy claimed he washed the knife in his bathroom, then went to his kitchen and saw the makings of breakfast on the table. McCoy had set the table for two; he had walked into Gacy's room to wake him while absentmindedly carrying the knife. Gacy buried McCoy in his crawl space and later covered his grave with a layer of concrete. In an interview several years after his arrest, Gacy said that immediately after killing McCoy, he felt "totally drained", yet noted that as he stabbed McCoy and listened to the "gurgulations" and gasping, he had experienced a mind-numbing orgasm. He added: "That's when I realized that death was the ultimate thrill."

=== Second murder ===
Gacy said he committed murder for the second time around January 1974. (Note: Some transcripts of the numerous confessions and statements Gacy gave to investigators immediately following his arrest state his second murder occurred in December 1974, although one of these statements—given in the presence of his attorneys in the early hours of December 22, 1978—indicates he may have confused the date of his first murder with a subsequent murder. The records of this confession state, "Gacy stabbed the first victim. He thought it was December of 1974.") This victim remains unidentified. He was strangled and placed in Gacy's closet before burial. Gacy later stated that bodily fluids leaked from the victim's mouth and nose, staining his carpet. Because of this incident, Gacy regularly stuffed rags, the victim's own underwear, or a sock deep into the mouths of subsequent victims to prevent such a leakage.

=== Murder of John Butkovich ===
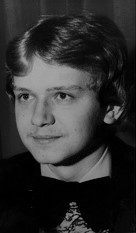
John Butkovich

On July 31, 1975, John Butkovich, an 18-year-old PDM employee, disappeared. Butkovich had worked for Gacy for approximately two years prior to his disappearance. His car was later found abandoned with his jacket and wallet inside and the keys in the ignition.

The day prior to his disappearance, Butkovich and two friends had confronted and threatened Gacy regarding two weeks' outstanding back pay owed to him. According to Gacy, the trio left his home after reaching a compromise that should credit be returned to his own contractor's account if carpeting Butkovich had purchased for his own apartment using Gacy's contractor's account was returned to the store, he would give Butkovich his check.

Gacy later admitted to encountering Butkovich exiting his car, waving to attract his attention as he had been "cruising" within and around Uptown. According to Gacy, Butkovich approached his car, stating, "I wanna talk to you." Gacy invited Butkovich back to his home, ostensibly to settle the issue of his overdue wages. (Note: Gacy's wife and stepdaughters were visiting his younger sister in Arkansas at the time.) At his home, Gacy offered Butkovich a drink, then conned him into allowing his wrists to be cuffed behind his back. Butkovich then threatened Gacy by saying: "When I get these cuffs off, you're a dead man." In response, Gacy replied, "Anyone gets killed, it's you, John [Butkovich]. Just sober up, okay?"

Gacy later confessed to having "sat on the kid's chest for a while" before he strangled him. He stowed Butkovich's body in his garage, intending to bury the body later in the crawl space. When his wife and stepdaughters returned home earlier than expected, Gacy buried Butkovich under the concrete floor of the tool room extension of his garage in an empty space where he had intended to dig a drain tile.

Butkovich's father called Gacy, who claimed he was happy to help search for his son but was sorry his son had "run away". When questioned by police, Gacy said Butkovich and two friends had arrived at his house demanding the overdue pay, but they had reached a compromise and all three had left. Over the following three years, Butkovich's parents called police more than 100 times, urging them to investigate Gacy further.

=== Cruising years ===
In addition to being the year his business expanded, Gacy freely admitted that 1975 was also when he began to increase the frequency of his excursions for sex with young males. He often referred to these jaunts as "cruising". Gacy committed most of his murders between 1976 and 1978, as he largely lived alone following his divorce.

Although Gacy remained gregarious and civic-minded, several neighbors noticed behavioral changes after his 1976 divorce, including seeing him keeping company with young males, hearing his car arrive or depart in the early morning, or seeing lights in his home switch on and off in the early hours. One neighbor later recollected that, for several years, muffled high-pitched screaming, shouting, and crying had repeatedly awakened her and her son in the early morning. She identified the sounds as emanating from a house adjacent to theirs on West Summerdale Avenue.

==== 1976 ====
One month after his divorce was finalized, Gacy abducted and murdered 18-year-old Darrell Samson. He was last seen alive in Chicago on April 6, 1976. Gacy buried him under the dining room, with cloth lodged in his throat. On May 14, 15-year-old Randall Reffett disappeared shortly after returning home from a dental appointment. Hours after Reffett was last seen, 14-year-old Samuel Stapleton vanished as he walked home from his sister's apartment. He and Reffett were close acquaintances; they were buried together in the crawl space, and investigators believe the two were murdered the same evening.

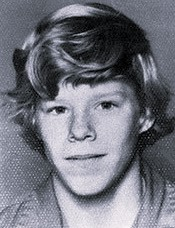
Michael Bonnin

On June 3, Gacy killed 17-year-old Michael Bonnin, who disappeared while traveling from Chicago to Waukegan. Gacy strangled Bonnin with a ligature and buried him under the spare bedroom. Ten days later, Gacy murdered 16-year-old William Carroll and buried him in a common grave in the crawl space. Carroll seems to have been the first of four victims known to have been murdered between June 13 and August 6, 1976. Three were between 16 and 17 years old, and one unidentified victim appears to have been an adult.

On August 5, 16-year-old James Haakenson is last known to have phoned his family—possibly from Gacy's home—to announce he had safely arrived in Chicago from Saint Paul, Minnesota. Haakenson died of suffocation. His body was buried in the crawl space beneath 17-year-old Rick Johnston, who was last seen alive in Uptown on August 6. (Note: Because Haakenson and Johnston disappeared just twenty-four hours apart and their bones were commingled, they may have been murdered on the same day or even at the same time.)

Gacy is thought to have murdered two unidentified males between August and October 1976. On October 24, Gacy abducted and killed teenage friends Kenneth Parker and Michael Marino: the two were last seen on Clark Street in Chicago. Two days later, 19-year-old construction worker William Bundy disappeared after informing his family he was to attend a party. Bundy died of suffocation. Gacy buried the body beneath his master bedroom. Bundy had apparently worked for Gacy.

Between November and December 1976, Gacy murdered 21-year-old Francis Alexander. His last contact with his family was a phone call to his mother sometime in November. He was not reported missing as his family believed he had moved to California shortly thereafter. Alexander was buried beneath the room Gacy used as his office.

In December 1976, 17-year-old Gregory Godzik disappeared. His girlfriend last saw him outside her house. Godzik had worked for PDM for less than three weeks when he disappeared. He had informed his family that Gacy had had him "dig trenches for some kind of (drain) tiles" in his crawl space. Godzik's car was later found abandoned. His parents and older sister contacted Gacy about Godzik's disappearance. Gacy claimed that Godzik had expressed a wish to run away from home; he also claimed to have received an answering machine message from Godzik shortly after he had disappeared. When asked if he could play the message for Godzik's parents, Gacy said he had erased it.

==== 1977 ====
On January 20, 1977, Gacy lured 19-year-old John Szyc to his house on the pretext of buying his Plymouth Satellite. He later confessed to strangling Szyc in his spare bedroom, claiming Rossi was asleep in the house the following morning. Gacy later sold the car to Rossi for $300.

Two months later, on March 15, 20-year-old Jon Prestidge disappeared. He was buried in the crawl space above the body of Francis Alexander. Shortly before his disappearance, Prestidge had mentioned he had obtained work with a local contractor. Gacy murdered one additional unidentified youth and buried him in the crawl space in the spring or early summer of 1977. On July 5, Gacy killed 19-year-old Matthew Bowman. Bowman's mother last saw him at a suburban train station; he had intended to travel to Harwood Heights for a court appointment.

The following month, Rossi was arrested for stealing gasoline while driving Szyc's car. The gas station attendant noted the license plate and police traced the car to Gacy's house. When questioned, Gacy told officers that Szyc had sold the car to him in February, saying he needed money to leave town. A check of the VIN confirmed the car had belonged to Szyc. The police did not pursue the matter further, although they did inform Szyc's mother that her son had sold his car.

By the end of 1977, Gacy had murdered six more young men between the ages of 16 and 21. The first of these was 18-year-old Robert Gilroy, the son of a Chicago police sergeant, last seen alive on September 15. Gilroy lived four blocks from Gacy's house. He was buried in the crawl space. On September 12, Gacy had flown to Pittsburgh, Pennsylvania, to supervise a remodeling project, and did not return to Chicago until September 16. Because Gacy was in another state at the time Gilroy was last seen, this is cited to support Gacy's claim of assistance from one or more accomplices in several homicides. Ten days after Gilroy was last seen, 19-year-old former U.S. Marine John Mowery disappeared after leaving his mother's house. Gacy strangled Mowery and buried his body beneath the master bedroom.

On October 17, 21-year-old Russell Nelson disappeared. Nelson was looking for contracting work. Gacy murdered and buried him beneath the guest bedroom. Less than four weeks later, Gacy murdered 16-year-old Robert Winch and buried him in the crawl space. Twenty-year-old Tommy Boling disappeared on November 18 after leaving a Chicago bar. On December 9, 19-year-old U.S. Marine David Talsma disappeared after telling his mother he was to attend a rock concert in Hammond, Indiana. Gacy strangled Talsma with a ligature and buried him in the crawl space, close to John Mowery.

On December 30, Gacy abducted 19-year-old college student Robert Donnelly from a Chicago bus stop at gunpoint. Gacy drove him to his home, where he raped, tortured, and repeatedly drowned Donnelly to unconsciousness in a bathtub as he made statements such as, "Aren't we playing fun games tonight?" Donnelly later testified at trial that he was in such pain that he asked Gacy to kill him. Gacy replied "I'm getting 'round to it." After several hours, Gacy drove Donnelly to his workplace and released him, warning him that if he complained to police, they would not believe him.

==== 1978 ====
Donnelly reported the assault, and police questioned Gacy on January 6, 1978. Gacy admitted to having had a "slave-sex" relationship with Donnelly, but insisted everything was consensual, adding that he "didn't pay the kid" the money he had promised him. The police believed him and filed no charges. The following month, Gacy killed 19-year-old William Kindred, who disappeared on February 16 after telling his fiancée, who knew Gacy, that he was going to a bar. Kindred was the final victim buried in the crawl space.

On March 21, Gacy lured 26-year-old Jeffrey Rignall into his car. Gacy chloroformed him and drove him to his house, where his arms and head were restrained in a pillory device affixed to the ceiling and his feet locked into another device. He raped and tortured Rignall with instruments including lit candles and whips and repeatedly chloroformed him into unconsciousness. Gacy then dumped Rignall in Chicago's Lincoln Park, unconscious but alive.

Rignall managed to stagger to his girlfriend's apartment. Police were informed of the assault but did not investigate Gacy. Rignall was able to recall the Oldsmobile, the Kennedy Expressway and particular side streets. He and two friends staked out the Cumberland exit of the Expressway and, in April, Rignall saw the Oldsmobile, which he and his friends followed to 8213 West Summerdale. Gacy was arrested on July 15, but was released on bail pending investigation and trial. He was facing trial for assault and battery against Rignall at the time of his arrest.

By mid-1978, the crawl space had no room for further bodies. Gacy later confessed to police that he considered stowing bodies in his attic, but had been worried about complications arising from "leakage". Therefore, he chose to dispose of his victims off the I-55 bridge into the Des Plaines River. Gacy stated he had thrown five bodies into this river in 1978, one of which he believed had landed on a passing barge; only four were ever found.

The first known victim thrown from the bridge was 20-year-old Timothy O'Rourke. He was murdered in mid-June after leaving his apartment to purchase cigarettes. Shortly before his disappearance, O'Rourke had told his roommate a contractor on the Northwest Side had offered him a job. On November 4, Gacy killed 19-year-old Frank Landingin. His naked body was found close to an inlet in the Des Plaines River by two duck hunters on November 12. On November 24, 20-year-old James Mazzara disappeared after Thanksgiving dinner with his family. Mazzara had informed his sister the day before that he was working in construction. He was last seen walking in the direction of Bughouse Square.

==== Murder of Robert Piest ====
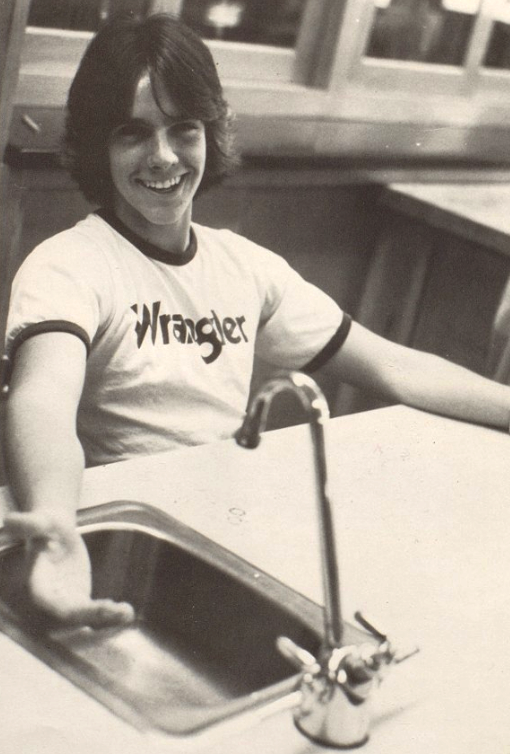
Robert Piest

On the afternoon of December 11, 1978, Gacy visited the Nisson Pharmacy in Des Plaines, to discuss a potential remodeling deal with the store owner, Phil Torf. While he was within earshot of 15-year-old part-time employee Robert Piest, Gacy mentioned his firm often hired teenage boys at a starting wage of $5 per hour—almost double the pay Piest earned at the pharmacy.

Shortly after Gacy left, Piest's mother arrived at the store to drive her son home so the family could celebrate her birthday together. Piest asked his mother to wait, adding that "some contractor wants to talk to me about a job". He left the store at 9:00 p.m., promising to return shortly.

Piest was murdered shortly after 10:00 p.m. at Gacy's home. Gacy later stated that at his house, he gave Piest a soft drink before asking whether there was anything he "wouldn't do for the right price", to which Piest replied that he did not mind working hard. In response, Gacy stated "good money" could be earned by hustling, although Piest was dismissive. Gacy then duped Piest into donning handcuffs. Gacy's subsequent statements regarding the events varied, although in one of his initial statements, he claimed Piest failed to resist as he removed the boy's trousers. He also stated that as he placed the rope around Piest's neck, the boy was "crying, scared". Gacy admitted to having received a phone call from a business acquaintance as Piest lay dying.

== Investigation ==
When Piest failed to return, his family filed a missing person report with the Des Plaines police. Torf named Gacy as the contractor Piest had most likely left the store to talk to. Lieutenant Joseph Kozenczak, whose son attended Maine West High School like Piest, chose to investigate Gacy further. A check of Gacy's criminal background revealed that he had an outstanding battery charge in Chicago and had been imprisoned in Iowa for the sodomy of a 15-year-old boy.

Kozenczak and two Des Plaines police officers visited Gacy at his home the following evening. Gacy indicated he had asked one of the youths working at the pharmacy—whom he believed to be Piest—whether there were any remodeling materials behind the store. He was adamant, however, that he had not offered Piest a job, and had only returned to the pharmacy shortly after 8:00 p.m. as he had left his appointment book. Gacy promised to come to the station later that evening to make a statement, indicating he was unable to do so at that moment as his uncle had just died. When questioned as to how soon he could come to the police station, he responded, "You guys are very rude. Don't you have any respect for the dead?"

At 3:20 a.m., Gacy arrived at the police station covered in mud, claiming he had been involved in a car accident. On returning to the police station later that day, Gacy denied any involvement in Piest's disappearance and repeated that he had not offered him a job. Gacy reiterated that he had returned to the pharmacy in response to a phone call from Torf informing him he had left his appointment book at the store. Detectives had already spoken with Torf, who denied calling Gacy. At the request of detectives, Gacy prepared a written statement detailing his movements on December 11.

=== First search warrant ===
Suspecting Gacy might be holding Piest at his home, Des Plaines police obtained a search warrant on December 13. This search revealed several suspicious items, including several police badges, a starting pistol, a syringe and hypodermic needle, handcuffs, books about homosexuality and pederasty, pornographic and stag films, capsules of amyl nitrite, a dildo, a two-by-four with two holes drilled into each end, bottles of Valium and atropine, several driver's licenses, a blue hooded parka, and underwear too small to fit Gacy. They also found a class ring engraved with the initials J.A.S. and a Nisson Pharmacy photo receipt in a trash can, alongside a 36-inch (91 cm) section of nylon rope.

=== Surveillance ===
The Des Plaines police confiscated and impounded Gacy's Oldsmobile and other PDM work vehicles. Surveillance teams (consisting of officers Mike Albrecht and David Hachmeister, and Ronald Robinson and Robert Schultz) monitored Gacy as the investigation continued. The following day, investigators received a phone call from Michael Rossi, who informed the investigators of Gregory Godzik's disappearance and the fact that another PDM employee, Charles Hattula, had been found drowned in an Illinois river earlier that year.

On December 15, Des Plaines investigators obtained further details of Gacy's battery charge, learning Jeffrey Rignall had reported that Gacy had lured him into his car, then chloroformed, raped and tortured him before dumping him in Lincoln Park. In an interview with Gacy's former wife the same day, they learned of the disappearance of John Butkovich. The same day, the class ring was traced to a John Alan Szyc. An interview with Szyc's mother revealed that several items from her son's apartment were also missing, including a Motorola television.

By December 16, Gacy was becoming affable with the surveillance detectives, regularly inviting them to join him for meals in restaurants and occasionally for drinks in bars or at his home. He repeatedly denied involvement with Piest's disappearance and accused the officers of harassing him because of his political connections or his recreational drug use. Knowing these officers were unlikely to arrest him on anything trivial, he openly taunted them by flouting traffic laws and succeeded in losing his pursuers more than once. That afternoon, Cram consented to a police interview in which he revealed that, because of his poor timekeeping, Gacy had once given him a watch which he claimed to have obtained "from a dead person". (Note: Cram also informed investigators in this interview Gacy had allowed him to retain a driver's license belonging to a DeVry University student he found in Gacy's garage in approximately February 1977 so he could engage in underage drinking. According to Cram, Gacy also informed him this identification belonged to a deceased individual.)

Investigators conducted a formal interview of Rossi on December 17. He informed them Gacy had sold him Szyc's vehicle, explaining that he had bought the car from Szyc because he needed money to move to California. A further examination of Gacy's Oldsmobile revealed a small cluster of fibers in the trunk, suspected to be human hair. That evening, three trained search dogs were used to determine whether Piest had been present in any of Gacy's vehicles. One laid on the passenger seat of Gacy's Oldsmobile in what the dog's handler informed investigators was a "death reaction", indicating Piest's body had been present.

That evening, Gacy invited detectives Albrecht and Hachmeister to a restaurant for a meal. Early on December 18, he invited them into another restaurant where, over breakfast, he discussed his business, his marriages and his clowning. During the conversation, Gacy remarked: "You know ... clowns can get away with murder."

By December 18, Gacy was beginning to display signs of strain from the constant surveillance: he was unshaven, looked tired and anxious and was drinking heavily. That afternoon, he drove to his lawyers' office to prepare a $750,000 civil suit against the Des Plaines police, demanding that they cease their surveillance. The same day, the Nisson Pharmacy photo receipt found in Gacy's kitchen was traced to 17-year-old Kimberly Byers, a colleague of Piest at Nisson Pharmacy. Byers stated that she had borrowed Piest's parka earlier in the evening and had placed the receipt in the pocket just before she returned the coat to Piest as he left the store.

=== Second search warrant ===
The same evening, Rossi was interviewed a second time. This time he was more cooperative. He informed detectives that in the summer of 1977, at Gacy's behest, he had spread ten bags of lime in the crawl space of Gacy's house.

On December 19, investigators began compiling evidence for a second search warrant for Gacy's house. The same day, Gacy's lawyers filed the civil suit against the Des Plaines police. The hearing for the suit was scheduled for December 22. That afternoon, Gacy invited the surveillance detectives inside his house again. As Robinson distracted Gacy with conversation, Schultz walked into Gacy's bedroom in an unsuccessful attempt to write down the serial number of the Motorola television they suspected belonged to Szyc. While flushing Gacy's toilet, the officer noticed a rancid smell he suspected could be that of rotting corpses emanating from a heating duct. (Note: Schultz initially believed this odor to source from a broken sewage pipe.) The officers who had searched Gacy's house previously had failed to notice this, as the house had been cold.

Investigators interviewed both Cram and Rossi on December 20. When questioned as to where he believed Gacy had concealed Piest's body, Rossi replied Gacy may have placed the body in the crawl space. Rossi agreed to submit to a polygraph test. He denied any involvement in Piest's disappearance or any knowledge of his whereabouts. He soon refused to continue the questioning, and Rossi's "erratic and inconsistent" responses while attached to the polygraph machine rendered Kozenczak "unable to render a definite opinion" as to his truthfulness. Rossi did, however, further discuss the trench digging he did in the crawl space and remarked on Gacy's insistence that he not deviate from where he was instructed to dig.

Cram informed investigators of Gacy's attempts to rape him in 1976. He stated that after he and Gacy had returned to his home after the December 13 search, Gacy had turned pale after seeing a clod of mud on his carpet and had immediately entered the crawl space to look for evidence of digging. When asked whether he had been to the crawl space, Cram replied he had once been asked by Gacy to spread lime down there and had also dug trenches, which Gacy had explained were for drainage pipes. Cram stated these trenches were 2 feet (0.6 m) wide, 6 feet (1.8 m) long and 2 feet deep—the size of graves.

==== Confession ====
On the evening of December 20, Gacy drove to his lawyers' office in Park Ridge to attend a scheduled meeting, ostensibly to discuss the progress of his civil suit. Gacy appeared anxious and disheveled and immediately asked for an alcoholic drink. Sam Amirante fetched a bottle of Seagrams whiskey, and Gacy immediately drank two cupfuls. Amirante—by this stage dubious of Gacy's claims of innocence—then asked what he had to discuss with them, placing a copy of the Daily Herald on his desk and stating: "You said you had something new to tell me! Something important!" Gacy picked up the newspaper, pointed to the front-page article covering the disappearance of Piest and said, "This boy is dead. He's dead. He's in a river."

Gacy then proceeded to give a rambling confession that ran into the early hours of the following morning. He began by stating he had "been the judge ... jury and executioner of many, many people", and that he now wanted to be the same for himself. He stated he had murdered "at least thirty" victims, most of whom he had buried in his crawl space, and had disposed of five other bodies in the Des Plaines River. Gacy dismissed his victims as "male prostitutes", "hustlers" and "liars", adding he sometimes awoke to find "dead, strangled kids" with their hands cuffed behind their back. He had buried their bodies in his crawl space as he believed they were his property.

As a result of the alcohol he had consumed, Gacy fell asleep midway through his confession. Amirante immediately arranged a psychiatric appointment for Gacy that morning. On awakening several hours later, Gacy shook his head when informed by Amirante he had confessed to killing approximately thirty people, saying, "Well, I can't think about this right now. I've got things to do." Ignoring his lawyers' advice regarding his scheduled appointment, Gacy left to attend to his business.

Gacy later recollected his memories of his final day of freedom as being "hazy", adding he knew his arrest was inevitable and that he intended to visit his friends and say his farewells. After leaving his lawyers' office, Gacy drove to a gas station where he handed a small bag of cannabis to the attendant, who immediately handed the bag to the surveillance officers, adding that Gacy had told him, "The end is coming (for me). These guys are going to kill me." Gacy then drove to the home of a fellow contractor and friend, Ronald Rhode. Gacy hugged Rhode before bursting into tears and saying, "I've been a bad boy. I killed thirty people, give or take a few." Gacy left Rhode and drove to Cram's home to meet with Cram and Rossi. The surveillance officers noted he was holding a rosary to his chin, praying while he drove along the expressway.

After talking with Cram and Rossi, Gacy had Cram drive him to a scheduled legal meeting. Cram informed the surveillance officers that Gacy had told him and Rossi that he had confessed to over thirty murders with his lawyers the previous evening. Gacy then had Cram drive him to Maryhill Cemetery, where his father was buried.

As Gacy drove to various locations that morning, police outlined the formal draft of their second search warrant, specifically to search for Piest's body in the crawl space. On hearing from the surveillance detectives that, in light of his erratic behavior, Gacy might be about to commit suicide, police decided to arrest him on a charge of possession and distribution of cannabis in order to hold him in custody, as the formal request for a second search warrant was presented. (Note: Recreational use of cannabis was illegal in the state of Illinois prior to 2020.)

At 4:30 p.m. on December 21, the eve of the hearing of Gacy's civil suit, a second search warrant was granted. After police informed Gacy of their intentions to search his crawl space for the body of Piest, Gacy denied the teenager was buried there, but confessed to having killed in self-defense a young man whose body was buried under his garage.

Armed with the signed search warrant, police and evidence technicians drove to Gacy's home. They found Gacy had unplugged his sump pump, flooding the crawl space with water; they replaced the plug and waited for the water to drain. Evidence technician Daniel Genty then entered the 28-by-38-foot (8.5 m × 11.6 m) crawl space, crawled to the southwest area and began digging. Within minutes, he uncovered putrefied flesh and a human arm bone. Genty shouted to the investigators that they could charge Gacy with murder, adding, "I think this place is full of kids." A police photographer uncovered a patella in the northeast corner. The two then began digging in the southeast corner, uncovering two lower leg bones.

The victims were too decomposed to be Piest. As the body in the northeast corner was unearthed, a crime scene technician discovered the skull of a second victim alongside this body. Later excavations of the feet of this second victim revealed a further skull beneath the body. Because of this, technicians returned to the trench where the first body was unearthed, discovering the rib cage of a fourth victim, confirming the scale of the murders.

==== Arrest ====
After being informed that police had found human remains in his crawl space and that he would now face murder charges, Gacy told officers he wanted to "clear the air". In the early morning hours of December 22, and in the presence of his lawyers, Gacy provided a formal statement in which he confessed to murdering approximately thirty young males—all of whom he claimed had entered his house willingly. Some victims were referred to by name, but Gacy claimed not to know or remember most of the names. He claimed all were teenage male runaways or male prostitutes, the majority of whom he had buried in his crawl space. Gacy claimed to have dug only five of the graves in this location and had his employees (including Godzik) dig the remaining trenches so that he would "have graves available". When shown a driver's license issued to a Robert Hasten which had been found on his property, Gacy claimed not to know this individual but admitted that this license had been in the possession of one of his victims. He also confessed to having planned to further conceal the bodies beneath his property by covering the entire crawl space with concrete in January 1979.

When questioned specifically about Piest, Gacy confessed to luring him to his house and strangling him on December 11. He also admitted to having slept alongside Piest's body that evening, before disposing of the corpse in the Des Plaines River in the early hours of December 13. On his way to the police station, he had been in a minor traffic accident after disposing of Piest. His vehicle had slid off an ice-covered road and had to be towed free.

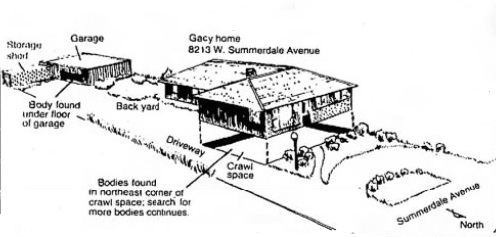
Diagram of Gacy's Norwood Park residence, depicting the dimensions of his crawl space

Accompanied by police, his lawyers, and his older sister, Gacy was driven to the I-55 bridge on December 23 to pinpoint the precise spot where he confessed to having thrown the body of Robert Piest and four other victims into the river. Gacy was then taken to his house and instructed to mark his garage floor with orange spray paint to show where he had buried the individual he had supposedly killed in self-defense, whom he named as John Butkovich. To assist officers in their search, Gacy drew a rough diagram of his basement to indicate where their bodies were buried. Twenty-six bodies were unearthed from Gacy's crawl space over the next week; three others were also unearthed elsewhere on his property. As the flooring and walls of the property were dismantled, additional evidence including identification cards and further deviant sex books were discovered. (Note: Police did confiscate sophisticated movie camera equipment from Gacy's property. However, no conclusive evidence exists to suggest any of Gacy's victims were forced to appear in snuff or pornographic films prior to their murder.)

== Trial ==
Gacy was brought to trial on February 6, 1980, charged with thirty-three murders. He was tried within the Cook County Criminal Court Building before Judge Louis Garippo; the jury was selected from Rockford because of extensive press coverage in Cook County.

At the request of his defense counsel, Gacy spent over three hundred hours with doctors at the Menard Correctional Center in Chester in the year before his trial. He underwent a variety of psychological tests to determine whether he was mentally competent to stand trial. Gacy attempted to convince the doctors that he had multiple personality disorder. He claimed to have four personalities: the hard-working, civic-minded contractor, the clown, the active politician, and a policeman called Jack Hanley, whom he referred to as "Bad Jack". When Gacy had confessed to police, he claimed to be relaying the crimes of Jack, who detested homosexuality and viewed male prostitutes as "weak, stupid and degraded scum". His lawyers opted to have Gacy plead not guilty by reason of insanity.

In his opening statement, one of Gacy's defense attorneys, Robert Motta, remarked: "The insanity defense has been looked [upon] as an escape; a defense of last resort. The defense of insanity is valid and it is the only defense that we could use here, because that is where the truth lies ... because if [Gacy] is normal, then our concept of normality is totally distorted." Presenting Gacy as a Jekyll-and-Hyde character, the defense produced several psychiatric experts who had examined Gacy; three testified they found him to be a paranoid schizophrenic with multiple personalities.

The prosecutors argued that Gacy was sane and in full control of his actions. They produced several witnesses to testify to his premeditation and the efforts he took to escape detection. Those doctors refuted the defense doctors' claims of multiple personalities and insanity. Cram and Rossi testified that Gacy had made them dig drainage trenches and spread bags of lime in his crawl space. Both said Gacy looked periodically into the crawl space to ensure they and other employees they supervised did not deviate from the precise locations he had marked.

On February 18, Robert Stein testified that all the bodies recovered from Gacy's property were "markedly decomposed [and] putrefied, skeletalized remains", and that of all the autopsies he performed, thirteen victims had died of asphyxiation, six of ligature strangulation, one of multiple stab wounds to the chest and ten in undetermined ways. (Note: Stein performed autopsies on each victim recovered at Gacy's property and on the body of Robert Piest. He did not perform autopsies on the three other victims recovered from the Des Plaines River.) When Gacy's defense team suggested that all thirty-three deaths were caused by accidental erotic asphyxia, Stein called this highly improbable.

Jeffrey Rignall testified for the defense on February 21. Rignall wept repeatedly while describing Gacy's torture of him in March 1978. During specific cross-examination relating to the torture, Rignall vomited and was excused from further testimony. On February 29, Donald Voorhees testified to his ordeal at Gacy's hands and his assault at Gacy's behest. Voorhees felt unable to testify but did briefly attempt to do so before being asked to step down. Robert Donnelly testified the week after Voorhees, recounting his ordeal at Gacy's hands in December 1977. Donnelly was visibly distressed as he recalled the abuse, although Gacy occasionally laughed or smirked as he recounted his ordeal.

During the fifth week of the trial, Gacy wrote a personal letter to Judge Garippo requesting a mistrial for reasons including that he did not approve of his lawyers' insanity plea; that his lawyers had not allowed him to take the witness stand (as he had wanted to do); that his defense had not called enough medical witnesses; that the police were lying with regard to verbal statements he had allegedly made to detectives after his arrest and that, in any event, the statements were "self-serving" for use by the prosecution. Judge Garippo informed Gacy that both counsels had not been denied the opportunity or funds to summon expert witnesses to testify, and that, under the law, he had the choice whether he wished to testify, and was free to indicate as much to the judge.

=== Closing arguments ===
On March 11, final arguments by both prosecution and defense attorneys began. Prosecuting attorney Terry Sullivan outlined Gacy's history of abusing youths, the testimony of his efforts to avoid detection and describing his surviving victims—Voorhees and Donnelly—as "living dead". Referring to Gacy as the "worst of all murderers", Sullivan stated, "John Gacy has accounted for more human devastation than many earthly catastrophes... I tremble when thinking about just how close he came to getting away with it all."

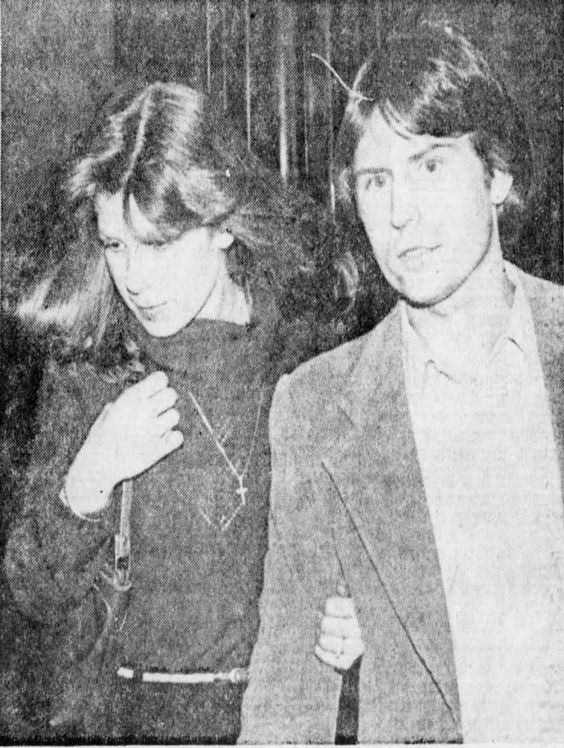
Kenneth Piest, brother of victim Robert Piest, pictured within the Cook County Criminal Court Building on March 12, 1980

After the state's four-hour closing, counsel Sam Amirante spoke for the defense. Amirante accused Sullivan of scarcely referring to the evidence in his own closing argument, and of arousing hatred against his client. He attempted to portray Gacy as "driven by compulsions he was unable to control", contending the State had not met their burden of proving Gacy sane beyond a reasonable doubt. Amirante then urged the jury to put aside any prejudice they held against his client and asked they deliver a verdict of not guilty by reason of insanity, adding that Gacy was a danger to both himself and to others, and that studying his psychology and behavior would be of benefit to science.

On the morning of March 12, William Kunkle continued to argue for the prosecution. Kunkle referred to the defense's contention of insanity as "a sham", arguing that the facts of the case demonstrated Gacy's ability to think logically and control his actions. Kunkle also referred to the testimony of one of the doctors who had examined Gacy in 1968 and had concluded he was an antisocial personality, stating that had the recommendations of this doctor been heeded, Gacy would not have been freed. At the close of his argument, Kunkle removed the photos of Gacy's twenty-two identified victims from a display board and asked the jury not to show sympathy but to "show justice". He then asked the jury to "show the same sympathy and pity this man showed when he took these lives and put them there!" before throwing the stack of photos into the opening of the trap door to Gacy's crawl space, which had been introduced as evidence and was on display in the courtroom.

The jury deliberated for one hour and fifty minutes. Gacy was found guilty of thirty-three charges of murder; he was also found guilty of sexual assault and taking indecent liberties with a child, both in reference to Robert Piest. At the time, Gacy's conviction for thirty-three murders was the most for which any person in U.S. history had been convicted.

In the sentencing phase of the trial, the jury deliberated for more than two hours before sentencing Gacy to death for each murder committed after the Illinois statute on capital punishment came into effect in June 1977. His execution was set for June 2, 1980.

== Death row ==
On being sentenced, Gacy was transferred to the Menard Correctional Center, where he remained on death row for fourteen years, repeatedly proclaiming, often via conflicting claims, his innocence.

Isolated in his prison cell, Gacy began to paint, with his artwork occasionally produced via commission. He drew inspiration from a wide range of sources for his artwork, depicting subjects as diverse as clowns (including himself as Pogo or Patches), Jesus, the Seven Dwarfs, skulls, his own home, Elvis Presley, and John Dillinger. Gacy created approximately 2,500 paintings; his artwork has been displayed at exhibitions and sold at auction. According to one of Gacy's appeal lawyers, Gacy had earned $30,000 from sales of his artwork by 1994.

Before his trial, Gacy initiated contact with journalist Russ Ewing, to whom he granted numerous interviews between 1979 and 1981. Ewing later collaborated with author Tim Cahill to publish the book Buried Dreams. The information Gacy divulged to Ewing regarding the circumstances of his first murder would prove instrumental in establishing the identity of his first victim.

On February 15, 1983, Henry Brisbon, a fellow death row inmate known as the I-57 killer, stabbed Gacy in the arm with a sharpened wire. He received treatment in the prison hospital.

=== Appeal efforts ===
Gacy filed voluminous motions and appeals, although he did not prevail in any. His appeals related to issues such as the validity of the first search warrant granted to the Des Plaines police on December 13, 1978, and his objection to his lawyers' insanity plea defense. Gacy contended that, although he had "some knowledge" of five of the murders (those of McCoy, Butkovich, Godzik, Szyc and Piest), the other 28 murders had been committed by employees who had keys to his house while he was away on business trips.

In mid-1984, the Supreme Court of Illinois upheld Gacy's conviction and ordered his execution by lethal injection on November 14. With legal assistance, Gacy filed a writ of certiorari against this decision which was denied by the Supreme Court of the United States on March 4, 1985. The following year, Gacy filed a further post-conviction petition, seeking a new trial. His then-defense lawyer, Richard Kling, argued that Gacy had been provided with ineffective legal counsel at his 1980 trial. This petition was dismissed on September 11, 1986.

Gacy appealed the 1985 decision that he be executed. The Illinois Supreme Court upheld his conviction on September 29, 1988, setting a new execution date of January 11, 1989. After the U.S. Supreme Court denied Gacy's final appeal in October 1993, the Illinois Supreme Court formally set an execution date for May 10, 1994.

== Execution ==
On the morning of May 9, 1994, Gacy was transferred to Stateville Correctional Center to be executed. That afternoon, he was allowed a private picnic on the prison grounds with his family. For his last meal, Gacy ordered a bucket of KFC, french fries, a dozen fried shrimp, fresh strawberries and a Diet Coke. That evening, he received the last rites from a Catholic priest before being escorted to the Stateville execution chamber. In the hours leading up to Gacy's execution, a crowd estimated at over 1,000 gathered outside the correctional center; a vocal majority were in favor of the execution, although a small number of anti-death penalty protesters were present. Some of those in favor of the execution wore T-shirts hearkening to Gacy's previous community services as a clown and bearing satirical slogans such as "No tears for the clown".

At 12:40 a.m., the procedure to administer the lethal injection began, although the chemicals used in the execution solidified unexpectedly, clogging the IV tube. The execution team replaced the clogged tube and the execution resumed. The entire procedure took 18 minutes. Anesthesiologists blamed the problem on the prison officials' inexperience at conducting an execution. This error apparently led to Illinois' adoption of an alternative method of lethal injection. One prosecutor at Gacy's trial, William Kunkle, said, "He got a much easier death than any of his victims."

According to published reports, Gacy was a diagnosed psychopath who did not express any remorse for his crimes. His final statement to his lawyer before his execution was that killing him would not compensate for the loss of others, and that the state was murdering him. His final spoken words were reported to be "Kiss my ass", although prosecutor William Kunkle stated in 2020 that these words were spoken to a prison official, and were not part of any official statement prior to Gacy's execution.

After Gacy's death was confirmed at 12:58 a.m. on May 10, 1994, his brain was removed. It is in the possession of Helen Morrison, a witness for the defense at Gacy's trial, who has interviewed Gacy and other serial killers in an attempt to isolate common personality traits of violent sociopaths. He was cremated, and the whereabouts of his ashes remain undisclosed.

=== Amber alert ===
In 1984, Sam Amirante authored procedures that were incorporated by the Illinois General Assembly into the Missing Child Recovery Act of 1984. At the time of the Gacy murders, Illinois police had to wait 72 hours before initiating a search for a missing child or adolescent. The Missing Child Recovery Act removed this waiting period. Other states subsequently adopted similar procedures. As a result, a national network aimed at locating missing children was gradually formed. This has since developed into the Child Abduction Emergency—commonly known as an Amber alert.

== Victims ==
Only twenty-eight of Gacy's victims have been conclusively identified. The youngest were Samuel Stapleton and Michael Marino, both 14. The oldest were Francis Alexander and Russell Nelson, both 21.

Name	Age	Date of murder	Date of identification	Recovery number	Location recovered
Timothy Jack McCoy	16	January 3, 1972	May 9, 1986	Body 9	Crawl space
John Butkovich	18	July 31, 1975	December 29, 1978	Body 2	Garage
Darrell Julius Samson	18	April 6, 1976	November 18, 1979	Body 29	Dining room
Randall Wayne Reffett	15	May 14, 1976	April 12, 1979	Body 7	Crawl space
Samuel G. Dodd Stapleton	14	May 14, 1976	November 14, 1979	Body 6	Crawl space
Michael Lawrence Bonnin	17	June 3, 1976	January 6, 1979	Body 18	Crawl space
William Huey Carroll Jr.	16	June 13, 1976	March 17, 1979	Body 22	Crawl space
James Byron Haakenson	16	August 5, 1976	July 19, 2017	Body 24	Crawl space
Rick Louis Johnston	17	August 6, 1976	January 1, 1979	Body 23	Crawl space
Kenneth Ray Parker	16	October 24, 1976	March 29, 1980	Body 15	Crawl space
Michael M. Marino	14	October 24, 1976	March 29, 1980	Body 14	Crawl space
William George Bundy	19	October 26, 1976	November 29, 2011	Body 19	Crawl space
Francis Wayne Alexander	21	c. December 1, 1976	October 25, 2021	Body 5	Crawl space
Gregory John Godzik	17	December 12, 1976	December 29, 1978	Body 4	Crawl space
John Alan Szyc	19	January 20, 1977	December 29, 1978	Body 3	Crawl space
Jon Steven Prestidge	20	March 15, 1977	January 6, 1979	Body 1	Crawl space
Matthew Walter Bowman	19	July 5, 1977	January 29, 1979	Body 8	Crawl space
Robert Edward Gilroy Jr.	18	September 15, 1977	January 6, 1979	Body 25	Crawl space
John Antheney Mowery	19	September 25, 1977	January 27, 1979	Body 20	Crawl space
Russell Lloyd Nelson	21	October 17, 1977	January 6, 1979	Body 16	Crawl space
Robert David Winch	16	November 10, 1977	September 11, 1979	Body 11	Crawl space
Tommy Joseph Boling	20	November 18, 1977	September 11, 1979	Body 12	Crawl space
David Paul Talsma	19	December 9, 1977	November 16, 1979	Body 17	Crawl space
William Wayne Kindred	19	February 16, 1978	May 16, 1979	Body 27	Crawl space
Timothy David O'Rourke	20	June 16–23, 1978	January 9, 1979	Body 31	Des Plaines River
Frank William Landingin	19	November 4, 1978	November 14, 1978	Body 32	Des Plaines River
James Mazzara	20	November 24, 1978	December 30, 1978	Body 33	Des Plaines River
Robert Jerome Piest	15	December 11, 1978	April 9, 1979	Body 30	Des Plaines River

=== Crawl space ===
Gacy's sketch of burial locations in his basement (left), and investigators' later diagram (right)

Cook County medical examiner Robert Stein supervised the exhumations of the victims buried on Gacy's property. The crawl space was marked in sections and each body was given an identifying number. The first body recovered from the crawl space was assigned a marker denoting the victim as Body 1. He was identified as Jon Prestidge on January 6, 1979. No cause of death could be determined.

John Butkovich was labelled as Body 2; he was among the first to be identified, on December 29, 1978. On December 23, investigators returned to unearth the three corpses which had been buried in the same trench as Body 1. Body 3 (John Szyc) was buried in the crawl space directly above Body 4 (Gregory Godzik); both were identified December 29, 1978. Body 5 was buried directly beneath Body 1; this victim was discovered 36 inches (910 mm) below the surface of the soil, indicating he was the first to be buried in this common grave.

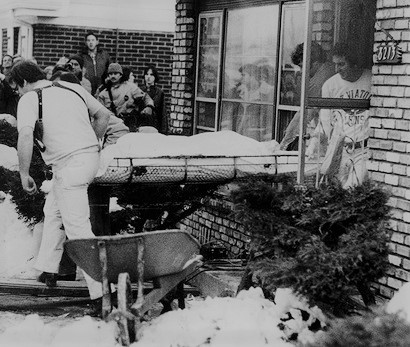
Medical examiners retrieve one of the first bodies exhumed from beneath Gacy's crawl space. December 23, 1978.

The search was postponed over Christmas. Four more bodies were unearthed on December 26. Body 6 (Samuel Stapleton, identified through dental records November 14, 1979) and Body 7 (Randall Reffett, identified through X-rays April 12, 1979) were buried in the same grave. Reffett was found in a fetal position with a cloth gag in his mouth, leading investigators to conclude he most likely died of asphyxiation. Body 8 (Matthew Bowman, identified January 29, 1979) was found with the tourniquet used to strangle him around his neck. Body 9 (Timothy McCoy, identified via dental records and a distinctive belt buckle in May 1986) was found beneath a layer of concrete and had several stab wounds to the ribs and sternum, suggesting he was Gacy's first victim.

On December 27, eight more bodies were discovered. Body 10, buried beneath the entrance to Gacy's home, remains unidentified; he is estimated to have been between 17 and 21 years old and between 5 ft 7 in and 5 ft 11 in (170 and 180 cm). Both Body 11 and Body 12 were found with ligatures around their necks and buried beside each other in the center of the crawl space; on September 11, 1979, they were identified as Robert Winch and Tommy Boling, respectively. Body 13 (still unidentified) was found beneath the spare bedroom; he is estimated to have been between 17 and 22 years old and between 5 ft 9 in and 6 ft 2 in (180 and 190 cm). Bodies 14 and 15 were recovered from a common grave; both were found with their head and upper torsos inside separate plastic bags. They were identified using dental records and radiology images as Michael Marino and Kenneth Parker on March 29, 1980 (too late to include among the victims identified before Gacy's trial). Body 16 (Russell Nelson, identified January 6, 1979) was found with a cloth rag lodged deep in his throat, causing him to die of suffocation. The seventeenth victim (identified as David Talsma using radiology images on November 16, 1979) was found with a ligature around his neck.

The following day, four more bodies were exhumed. Body 19 was buried directly beneath Gacy's master bedroom; Body 18 (Michael Bonnin, identified January 6, 1979) was located beneath the spare bedroom, and found with a ligature around the neck. Body 20 (John Mowery, identified through dental records January 27, 1979) was buried in the northwest corner of the crawl space.

By December 29, six more bodies were unearthed. Bodies 22, 23, 24, and 26 were buried in a common grave beneath Gacy's kitchen and laundry room, with Body 25 (Robert Gilroy, identified January 6, 1979) located beneath Gacy's bathroom. Body 26, still unidentified, was estimated to have been between 23 and 30 years old and approximately 5 ft 4 in (160 cm) in height. Body 22 (identified using dental records as William Carroll on March 17, 1979) was found beneath Gacy's kitchen with cloth-like material lodged in his throat. Two socks were recovered from the pelvic region. He was buried directly beneath Body 21, recovered the previous day; this victim, who remains unidentified, is estimated to have been aged between 15 and 24 years old and approximately 5 ft 10 in (180 cm) in height. The bones of victims 23 (identified as Rick Johnston January 1, 1979) and 24 were commingled; cloth was found inside the mouth of Bodies 24 and 26. Body 25 was found beneath Gacy's bathroom with cloth lodged in the throat. The final victim recovered from the crawl space (William Kindred, identified May 16, 1979) was also found beneath the bathroom, with cloth lodged deep in his throat.

Operations were suspended due to the Chicago Blizzard of 1979, but resumed in March despite Gacy's insistence that all the buried victims had been found. On March 9, Body 28 was found wrapped in several plastic bags and buried beneath the patio in Gacy's backyard. Gacy's likely second murder victim (Note: The unidentified victim known as Body 10 may actually have been Gacy's second murder victim and first unidentified victim. According to Gacy's account, his second victim had also been buried in the crawl space close to his first. However, at Gacy's trial, prosecutor William Kunkle theorized his second murder victim must have been buried near his barbecue pit if his wife still resided with him at the time of the murder.) and still unidentified, he stood approximately 5 ft 9 in (180 cm) and is estimated to be aged between 14 and 18. On March 16, Body 29 (Darrell Samson, identified November 18, 1979) was found beneath the dining room.

All the victims discovered at Gacy's house were in an advanced state of decomposition. Dental records and X-ray charts helped Stein identify the remains. By 1986, nineteen victims recovered from Gacy's property had been identified via dental records and two via skeletal trauma. These identifications were supported with personal artifacts found in Gacy's home.

The head and upper torso of several bodies unearthed beneath Gacy's property had been placed in plastic bags. (Note: Gacy stated in a January 1979 interview that he would cover the victim's head or upper torso with a plastic bag if he noticed bleeding from the nose or mouth.) In some cases, bodies were found with foreign objects such as prescription bottles lodged in their pelvic region, the position of which indicated the items had been thrust into the victims' anus. Stein concluded 12 victims recovered from Gacy's property died of asphyxiation. Gacy's vacant house was demolished in April 1979.

=== Des Plaines River ===
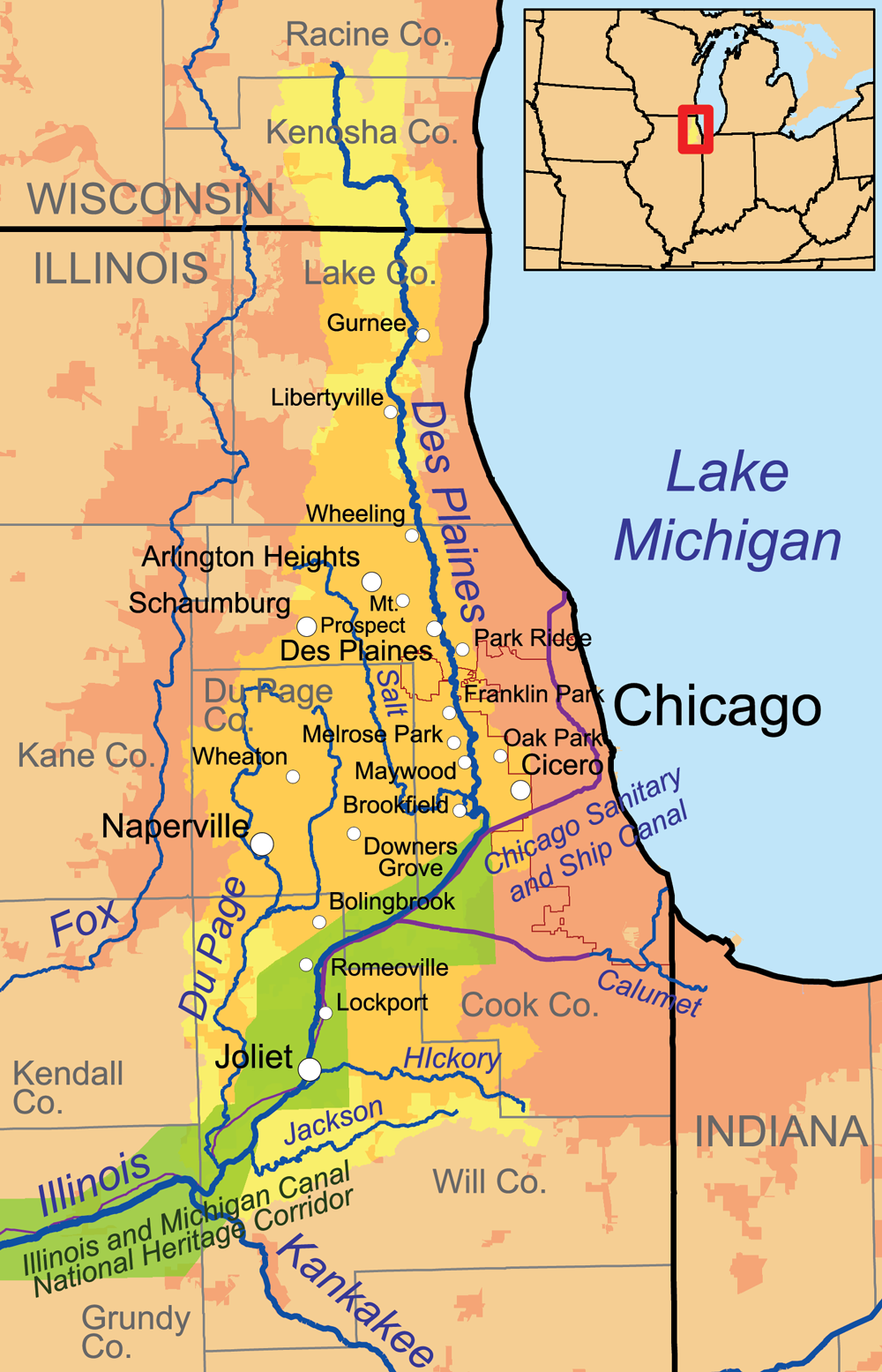
In June 1978, Gacy began discarding the bodies of his victims in the Des Plaines River (pictured), as his crawl space was full.

The victim found 6 miles (9.7 km) downstream from the I-55 bridge on June 30 was not connected initially to Gacy. On January 9, 1979, this victim was identified using fingerprint records and a distinctive tattoo as Timothy O'Rourke. An autopsy was unable to rule out strangulation as the cause of death. This victim was numbered 31. Following Gacy's arrest, investigators discovered he was a further victim.

Frank Landingin's cause of death was certified at autopsy as suffocation through his own underwear being lodged down his throat. His body was also identified via fingerprint records. A bond slip issued to Landingin the day before his death was found at Gacy's home; he was assigned victim number 32.

On December 28, one further body linked to Gacy was found 1 mile (1.6 km) from the I-55 bridge. This victim was identified two days later as James Mazzara, whom Gacy confessed to having murdered shortly after Thanksgiving. Mazzara had been strangled with a ligature.

On April 9, 1979, a man walking along a Grundy County towpath discovered a decomposed body tangled in roots on the edge of the Des Plaines River. The body was identified via dental records as being that of Robert Piest the same evening. An autopsy revealed that three wads of "paper-like material" had been shoved down his throat, causing him to suffocate.

=== Unidentified victims ===
Five victims have never been identified. Based on Gacy's confession, the location of the victims buried in the crawl space, and forensic analysis, police determined the most likely dates for when his unidentified victims were killed.

1. January 3, 1972 – July 31, 1975. Body 28. Backyard. Male aged 14–18.
2. June 13 – August 6, 1976. Body 26. Crawl space. Male aged 23–30.
3. August 6 – October 5, 1976. Body 13. Crawl space. Male aged 17–22.
4. August 6 – October 24, 1976. Body 21. Crawl space. Male aged 15–24. (Note: Some sources state the age of this victim to be between 21 and 27 years old.)
5. March 15 – July 5, 1977. Body 10. Crawl space. Male aged 17–21.

In late 1979, forensic expert Betty Pat Gatliff used the skulls of the remaining unidentified victims to create facial reconstructions.

==== Recent identification efforts ====
In October 2011, Cook County sheriff Thomas Dart publicly announced that investigators, having obtained DNA profiles from Gacy's unidentified victims, intended to renew their efforts to identify them. Sheriff Dart announced these intentions at a press conference in which he stated that investigators sought DNA samples from any individuals in the United States related to young males reported missing between 1970 and 1979.

Facial reconstructions of the unidentified victims, released to the media in 1980. Depicted left to right are Body 5 (later identified as Francis Alexander), Body 9 (later identified as Timothy McCoy), Body 24 (later identified as James Haakenson), Body 19 (later identified as William Bundy), Body 21, Body 28, Body 13, Body 26, and Body 10.

To date, the identification of three victims has been confirmed, numerous other missing youths have been ruled out as being victims of Gacy, and four unrelated cold cases dating between 1972 and 1979 have been solved. Updated facial reconstructions of Bodies 10, 13 and 28 have since been released to the media.

In November 2011, William Bundy was identified through DNA testing. Shortly after Gacy's arrest, Bundy's family had contacted his dentist in the hope of submitting his dental records for comparison with the unidentified bodies, but the records had been destroyed after his dentist had retired. In July 2017, 16-year-old James Haakenson was identified using DNA testing. Francis Wayne Alexander was identified via forensic genealogy in October 2021.

In 2012, the DNA of Gacy and other executed Illinois inmates was entered into a national DNA database in efforts to establish potential forensic links to further unsolved murders.

=== Possible additional victims ===
At the time of Gacy's arrest, he had claimed to investigators that the total number of murder victims could be as high as forty-five. However, only thirty-three victims were ever linked to him. Investigators excavated the grounds of his property until they had exposed the substratum of clay beneath the foundations, finding twenty-nine bodies.

Shortly after his arrest, Gacy informed investigators that after he had assaulted and then released Jeffrey Rignall in March 1978, he began to throw his murder victims into the Des Plaines River. He confessed to having disposed of five bodies in this manner; however, only four bodies recovered from the Des Plaines River were linked to him. When asked whether there were more victims, Gacy stated, "That's for you guys to find out." (Note: In one audiotaped confession with his lawyer, Gacy claimed to have disposed of the body of an unidentified victim in woodland near Maine Township High School. Gacy estimated this victim to be approximately twenty-four years old, with military connections.)

Disputed DNA and dental tests conducted between 2012 and 2016 indicate that neither body found in the common grave in Gacy's crawl space and identified as those of Kenneth Parker and Michael Marino in 1980 was actually Marino. Marino's mother had always doubted her son's identification because the clothing found on Body 14 was inconsistent with what he had worn when she last saw him. DNA testing conducted on the exhumed body of Parker has proven that Marino's body had not been mistaken for his. (Note: Parker's relatives refused to submit to DNA testing.) In addition, the dental X-ray conducted on the victim identified as Michael Marino had revealed he had all of his second molars; a dental X-ray conducted on Marino in March 1976 revealed one molar had not erupted. The original identification of the body has been disputed because the exhumed body had neither an upper nor lower jaw bone. Nonetheless, the orthodontist who had identified Marino's remains has stated his conviction in the accuracy of his findings.

On May 23, 1978, 25-year-old Charles Antonio Hattula was found drowned in the Pecatonica River near Freeport, Illinois. He had been missing since May 13. Hattula was an employee of PDM and had been linked to the initial investigation of Gacy after Michael Rossi informed investigators of both Godzik's disappearance and Hattula's death. Moreover, Rossi had stated that Hattula was known to have conflicts with Gacy, and when he had "failed to show up at work", Gacy had informed him and several other employees that he had drowned.

At the time of Hattula's death, no more bodies could be stored in Gacy's crawl space, which leaves a possibility he had disposed of Hattula's body in the Pecatonica River. However, Des Plaines authorities had contacted Freeport during their investigation into Gacy, and were told on December 27 that Hattula had fallen to his death from a bridge while attempting to free a stranded vehicle. Hattula's death has been officially ruled as asphyxia by drowning.

Retired Chicago police officer Bill Dorsch stated he had reason to believe there might be more victims buried in the grounds of an apartment building on West Miami Avenue in Chicago, where Gacy had been the caretaker for several years. In 1975, Dorsch—then a Chicago police officer—observed Gacy (whom he knew on a casual basis) holding a shovel in the early morning. When Dorsch confronted him, Gacy said he was doing work that he was too busy to do during the day. Dorsch also said that several other residents of West Miami Avenue stated they had seen Gacy digging trenches at the property in the early to mid-1970s. Gacy was then still married to Carole Hoff. In March 2012, Cook County Sheriff's officials submitted a request to excavate the grounds of this property. The Cook County State's Attorney denied the request, citing a lack of probable cause, including the results of a 1998 search of the property. However, the sheriff's office noted that in 1998, a radar survey suggested fourteen areas of interest within the grounds, yet only two of these had been excavated; four of those remaining were described as being "staggeringly suggestive" of human skeletons. A second request to excavate the grounds was granted in January 2013, and a search of the property was conducted in the spring. Both FBI sniffer dogs and ground-penetrating radar equipment were used, but no human remains were found. (Note: Some parties have questioned the integrity and thoroughness of the second search, citing the fact the ground of the property was still frozen on the date of the search (March 20), that the press had not been informed that the property had been searched until six days after the search had been conducted, and that the sniffer dogs used had solely been provided core samples of soil to test.)

== Potential accomplices ==
One of the first things Gacy told investigators after his arrest was that he had not acted alone in several of the murders: he asked whether "my associates" had been arrested. When questioned whether these associates had participated directly or indirectly in the killings, Gacy replied, "Directly". He later claimed Cram and Rossi were involved in several of the murders. Some defense attorneys and investigators researching the possibility Gacy had not acted alone in several of the murders have said there is "overwhelming evidence Gacy worked with an accomplice".

In the 1980s, Gacy informed FBI profiler Robert Ressler that "two or three" PDM employees had assisted in several murders. Ressler believed there were unexplained avenues to the case and that Gacy had killed more than thirty-three victims in multiple states. Gacy neither confirmed nor denied Ressler's suspicions. (Note: Several years prior to his execution, Gacy gave Ressler a painting with a written inscription reading: "Dear Bob Ressler, You cannot hope to enjoy the harvest, without first laboring in the fields".) (Note: As a child, Ressler lived just four blocks from Gacy in Chicago and Gacy had delivered groceries to Ressler's family.) Jeffrey Rignall, who had been assaulted and tortured by Gacy in March 1978, was adamant that at one point during his ordeal, a young man with brown hair had watched and participated in his abuse. (Note: Rignall also stated in his autobiography, 29 Below, that at one stage throughout his abuse, a light had been switched on in another part of the home as Gacy taunted him. He also claimed that as Gacy sodomized him, a young, brown-haired man had simultaneously performed oral sex on him.)

Three days before his arrest, two officers followed Gacy to a bar where he met two employees—Michael Rossi and Ed Hefner. An anxious Gacy was observed walking with the two out of earshot of the officers to talk before returning closer. Gacy said to both young men: "You'd better not let me down, you fuckers. You owe it to me." The officers then overheard sections of a hushed conversation between Gacy and the two during which Rossi asked Gacy, "And what? Buried like the other five?"

In interviews from death row, Gacy said that at the time of his arrest, three PDM employees were also considered suspects in the murders—all of whom he said were in possession of keys to his house. In addition to Cram and Rossi, Gacy named his former employee Phillip Paske, who was an acquaintance of Cram and a close associate of John David Norman. In the late 1970s, Norman operated a nationwide sex trafficking ring based in Chicago known as the Delta Project with the help of Paske. At least two victims believed to have been murdered by Gacy (Kenneth Parker and Michael Marino) had last been seen alive close to where Norman lived. This led to speculation that Gacy had been connected to this trafficking ring.

Gacy claimed that he was not in Chicago when sixteen of the identified victims disappeared. In 2012, two Chicago lawyers said travel records show that he had been in another state at the time of three of the murders, implying he had one or more accomplices.

Investigators note that Robert Young, the traveling companion with whom victim Russell Nelson was visiting Chicago at the time of his disappearance, gave differing accounts of his disappearance. Young filed a missing person's report with Chicago police before unsuccessfully requesting money from Nelson's parents to finance a search. When Nelson's brothers arrived in Chicago to search for him, Young offered them a job with PDM. Young was never summoned to testify at Gacy's trial.

== Films and media ==
- The made-for-TV film To Catch a Killer, starring Brian Dennehy as Gacy, was released in 1992. The film is based largely on the investigation and apprehension of Gacy following the disappearance of Robert Piest, by Des Plaines Police.
- A feature film, Gacy, was released in 2003. This film cast Mark Holton in the role of Gacy and depicts his life after he moved to Norwood Park in 1971 until his arrest in 1978.
- The made-for-TV film Dear Mr. Gacy, released in 2010, stars William Forsythe as Gacy. The film is based on the book The Last Victim by Jason Moss. The film focuses on the correspondence between Moss and Gacy before Gacy invited Moss to visit him on death row in 1994.
- The 2010 horror film 8213: Gacy House is based on paranormal investigators spending a night in the house built on the former site of 8213 W. Summerdale.
- The Discovery Channel broadcast an episode relating to Gacy's crimes in the true crime series The New Detectives: Case Studies in Forensic Science. This documentary features an interview between Gacy and FBI profiler Robert Ressler.
- The Investigation Discovery channel has broadcast two documentaries about the Gacy murders. The first was commissioned for the Most Evil series, a forensics program in which forensic psychiatrist Michael H. Stone analyzes murderers and psychopaths. The second is featured in the Evil Lives Here series. This program explores how Gacy's actions affected his family; Gacy's sister and niece are among those interviewed.
- The Biography Channel broadcast a 45-minute documentary on Gacy's crimes.
- The television program Psychic Investigators broadcast an episode entitled "What Lies Below". This program focuses on the consultation between Detective Joseph Kozenczak and psychic Carol Broman, whom Kozenczak had met on December 17, 1978, to discuss the whereabouts of the body of Robert Piest.
- The Lifetime Movies network series Monster in My Family broadcast "Killer Clown: John Wayne Gacy" in August 2015. The episode features Karen Kuzma, Gacy's sister, and her daughter, and focuses on formative events in Gacy's life that may have initiated his later crimes.
- Deadly Legacy: Gacy. A three-part documentary series commissioned by the Investigation Discovery channel focusing on ongoing efforts to identify Gacy's victims. The first episode of this series was broadcast in December 2018.
- The documentary series John Wayne Gacy: Devil in Disguise. Commissioned by Peacock, the first episode was broadcast in March 2021. This six-part series includes interviews with Gacy, investigators responsible for his apprehension, and Cook County Sheriff Thomas Dart.
- Conversations with a Killer: The John Wayne Gacy Tapes. Commissioned by Netflix and directed by Joe Berlinger, this series includes previously unreleased recordings of conversations between Gacy and his lawyer. The first of this three-part series was broadcast on April 20, 2022.
- Defense Diaries: A podcast series hosted by the son of Gacy's defense attorney Robert Motta. The series includes previously unreleased cassette recordings of pretrial interviews with Gacy and his attorneys.
- The John Wayne Gacy Murders: Life and Death in Chicago. Produced and directed by John Borowski, this eight-part documentary miniseries was released in 2024 and features interviews with several individuals responsible for Gacy's apprehension and conviction.
- Devil in Disguise: John Wayne Gacy. An eight-episode limited series commissioned by Peacock. This series premiered on October 16, 2025, and stars Michael Chernus as Gacy.

== See also ==
- List of homicides in Illinois
- List of people executed in Illinois
- List of people executed in the United States in 1994
- List of serial killers by number of victims
- List of serial killers in the United States

== Cited works ==
- Amirante, Sam L.; Broderick, Danny (2011). John Wayne Gacy: Defending a Monster. Skyhorse. ISBN 978-1-61608-248-2.
- Bailey, Frankie Y.; Chermak, Steven M. (2004). Famous American Crimes and Trials: 1960-1980. Praeger Publishers. ISBN 978-0-275-98337-6.
- Berry-Dee, Christopher (2009). Born Killers: Childhood Secrets of the World's Deadliest Serial Killers. John Blake. ISBN 978-1-85782-648-7.
- Berry-Dee, Christopher (2008). How to Make a Serial Killer: The Twisted Development of Innocent Children into the World's Most Sadistic Murderers. Simon & Schuster. ISBN 978-1-569-75943-1.
- Berry-Dee, Christopher (2007). Serial Killers: Up Close and Personal. Inside the World of Torturers, Psychopaths, and Mass Murderers. Ulysses Press. ISBN 978-1-569-75619-5.
- Cahill, Tim (1993) [1986]. Buried Dreams: Inside the Mind of a Serial Killer. Bantam Books. ISBN 978-1-857-02084-7. OCLC 12421532.
- Murder Casebook, Investigations into the Ultimate Crime. Marshall Cavendish. 1990. ISBN 0748514546.
- Conti, Karen (2024). Killing Time with John Wayne Gacy: Defending America's Most Evil Serial Killer on Death Row. Black Lyon Publishing. ISBN 979-8-986-51247-1.
- Evans, Colin (2007). The Casebook of Forensic Detection: How Science Solved 100 of the World's Most Baffling Crimes. Wiley. ISBN 978-0-471-07650-6.
- Foreman, Laura (1992). Serial Killers: True Crime. The editors of Time-Life Books (Hardcover ed.). Time-Life. ISBN 978-0-7835-0001-0.
- Greene, David; Williams, David (2013). Manual of Forensic Odontology. CRC Press. ISBN 978-1-439-85134-0.
- Hare, Robert D. (1999). Without Conscience: The Disturbing World of the Psychopaths Among Us. Guilford Press. ISBN 978-1-57230-451-2.
- Hunter, Brad (2022). Inside the Mind of John Wayne Gacy: The Real-Life Killer Clown. Ad Lib Publishers. ISBN 978-1-802-47076-5.
- Linedecker, Clifford L. (1980). The Man Who Killed Boys: A True Story of Mass Murder in a Chicago Suburb (First ed.). St. Martin's Press. ISBN 0-312-51157-4. OCLC 5564916.
- Linedecker, Clifford L. (1986). The Man Who Killed Boys: A True Story of Mass Murder in a Chicago Suburb (Paperback ed.). St. Martin's Press. ISBN 0-312-95228-7.
- Nelson, David (2021). Boys Enter the House: The Victims of John Wayne Gacy and the Lives they Left Behind (Hardback ed.). Chicago Review Press. ISBN 978-1-641-60486-4.
- Newburn, Tim (2011) [1989]. Policing.
- Olsen, Jack (2008). The Man with the Candy: The Story of the Houston Mass Murders. Simon & Schuster. ISBN 978-1-439-12870-1.
- Peck, Dennis L.; Dolch, Norman Allan (2001). "Behavior Beyond the Boundaries". Extraordinary Behavior: A Case Study Approach to Understanding Social Problems. Greenwood. ISBN 0-275-97057-4. OCLC 43694355.
- Ramsland, Katherine; Ullman, Tracy (2024). The Serial Killer's Apprentice: The True Story of How Houston's Deadliest Murderer Turned a Kid Into a Killing Machine. Penzler Publishers. ISBN 978-1-613-16495-2.
- Ressler, Robert; Schachtman, Tom (1992). Whoever Fights Monsters: My Twenty Years Hunting Serial Killers for the FBI. St Martin's Press. ISBN 0-312-95044-6. OCLC 27658115.
- Rignall, Jeffrey; Wilder, Ronald (1979). 29 Below: An Encounter with John Wayne Gacy. Wellington Press. ISBN 0-363-03363-9.
- Stone, Michael; Brucato, Gary (2019). The New Evil: Understanding the Emergence of Modern Violent Crime. Prometheus Books. ISBN 978-1-633-88532-5.
- Sullivan, Terry; Maiken, Peter T. (2000). Killer Clown: The John Wayne Gacy Murders (Paperback ed.). Pinnacle. ISBN 0-7860-1422-9. OCLC 156783287.
- Taylor, Troy (2009). True Crime: Illinois: The State's Most Notorious Criminal Cases (Paperback ed.). Stackpole Books. ISBN 978-0-811-73562-9.
- Wilson, Colin, ed. (1997). "Murder in Mind – John Wayne Gacy". Murder in Mind (11). Marshall Cavendish. ISSN 1364-5803.
