= To Catch a Killer (1992 film) =

1992 Canadian TV film

- Genre: Biography; Crime; Drama; Thriller; Police Procedural
- Written by: Jud Kinberg
- Directed by: Eric Till
- Starring: Brian Dennehy; Michael Riley
- Music by: Paul Zaza
- Countries of origin: Canada; United States
- Original language: English

Production
- Executive producers: Jud Kinberg; Jinny Schreckinger
- Producer: Richard O. Lowry
- Production location: Toronto
- Cinematography: Rene Ohashi
- Editor: Ralph Brunjes
- Running time: 182 minutes
- Production companies: Creative Entertainment Group; Libra Pictures; Telestories Entertainment Inc.

Original release
- Network: Fox
- Release: May 15, 1992

To Catch a Killer is a two-part television film from 1992, directed by Eric Till and starring Brian Dennehy and Michael Riley. It is the mostly historically accurate story of the pursuit of American serial killer John Wayne Gacy, which took place during a 10-day period in December 1978.

== Plot ==
As he investigates the missing person report of a teenager named Christopher Gant (based on Gacy's final victim, Robert Piest), Des Plaines detective Lt. Joseph R. Kozenczak (Riley) becomes concerned that local businessman John Wayne Gacy (Dennehy) may be responsible for this as well as many other disappearances. However, when he and his team are ready to arrest Gacy, their evidence is viewed as being circumstantial. Worst of all, everyone (including Kozenczak's superiors) view Gacy as a respectable pillar of society. At first Gacy plays a game of cat and mouse with the detectives and threatens the department with a harassment lawsuit. Meanwhile, the investigation uncovers more pieces of evidence and under close surveillance, Gacy begins to deteriorate.

After eventually securing a second search warrant, Kozenczak finds 29 bodies buried throughout John Gacy's property; the remaining four are found dumped in a nearby river, including Gant's remains. Afterwards, he is charged with the rape and murder of 33 boys and young men and convicted, being sentenced to death.

== Cast ==
- Brian Dennehy as John Wayne Gacy
- Michael Riley as Lieutenant Joseph "Joe / Polack" Kozenczak
- Margot Kidder as Rachel Grayson
- Meg Foster as City Attorney Linda Carlson
- Martin Julien as Theodore "Ted" Koslo
- Scott Hylands as Delta Squad Sergeant Mike Paxton
- David Eisner as Detective Terry Williams
- John Boylan as Detective Gary Atkins
- Tony De Santis as Delta Squad Detective Craig DeMarco
- Mark Humphrey as Delta Squad Detective King
- Gary Reineke as Delta Squad Detective Leonard "Lenny" Petrie
- Tim Progosh as Delta Squad Detective Jack Morris
- Danny Pawlick as Patrolman Tony Santori
- Bruce Ramsay as Forensic Officer Edward "Ed" Bragg
- Brenda Bazinet as Alice Pearson
- Liliane Clune as Marcia Kozenczak
- Toby Proctor as Michael Kozenczak
- Christopher Marren as Billy
- Jay Brazeau as Jake Burns

== Impact/reception ==
The film was broadcast in three countries, the United States, Canada and the United Kingdom. In general, the film was received well by critics. As a result, Brian Dennehy was nominated for an Emmy Award for "Outstanding Lead Actor in a Miniseries or a Special." In addition, actor Michael Riley and director Eric Till were both nominated for two individual Gemini Awards.

== Historical context ==
The film broadly follows the historical narrative of the investigation which led to John Wayne Gacy's arrest in December 1978 and it does not directly depict his earlier life or his criminal activity prior to 1978. Several changes were made to the names and details of the real persons who were involved in the case. These changes were probably made for legal reasons, because many key witnesses and victims' family members, as well as Gacy himself, were still alive at the time of the film's production. In the film, Gacy's last known victim, Robert Piest, was represented as Chris Gant. In the film the name of Gacy's contracting company was changed from PDM Contractors to LPW Construction. The real-life detective Lt. Joseph R. Kozenczak served as a technical advisor during the film's production.

Dennehy's performance was widely recognized and the actor became associated with Gacy. In 2010, eighteen years after the film's first broadcast in the US and sixteen years after John Wayne Gacy's execution, a profile of Dennehy in Times of North West Indiana noted, "whenever Dennehy comes back to Chicago, which is often ... he's inevitably asked about his made-for-television 1992 movie role in To Catch a Killer." Dennehy received a letter from Gacy following the film's US broadcast, in which Gacy admonished him for taking part in a "fraud" film, and maintained his claim that "lots of people had access to that crawl space."
