= Robert A. Roth =

American publisher and art collector (born 1947)

Robert A. "Bob" Roth (born March 19, 1947) is an American publisher and art collector who lives in Chicago. He was the founder and publisher of the Chicago Reader, one of the most influential and successful newspapers of its type. He was also one of the founders and the first president of Intuit Art Museum, located in Chicago. Intuit is the only nonprofit organization in the U.S. dedicated solely to presenting “outsider” art by self-taught artists.

Roth grew up in Arlington Heights, Illinois, a suburb of Chicago, and attended Carleton College in Northfield, Minnesota, graduating magna cum laude in 1969. In the fall of that year he began graduate studies in political philosophy at the University of Chicago, but before earning a degree he left to devote his energies to the Reader, which he started with a group of Carleton friends in 1971.

The Reader was one of the first and ultimately one of the most successful in a genre of urban newspapers that came to be known as the alternative weekly. Roth modeled it after New York's Village Voice and papers he had seen in Boston, but with one important difference: the Reader was free, distributed at bookstores, bars and shops. At the time, free circulation was disreputable. Roth, who was president of the Association of Alternative Newsweeklies from 1983 to 1987, proselytized for the free model and, as the Reader prospered, papers in other cities began to adopt it. By 1996, when the Village Voice converted to free circulation, the entire industry had followed the Reader's lead.

Roth was publisher of the Reader from 1971 to 1994, editor and publisher from 1975 to 1990, and president of the company until it was sold in 2007. In addition he was president of the company that published Washington City Paper, which was owned by the same group and also sold in 2007. Since then Roth has been president of Quarterfold, Inc., which holds former Reader assets not transferred in the sale, including an interest in Index Newspapers, the company that publishes The Stranger of Seattle and the Portland Mercury in Oregon.

Roth began collecting art in the mid-1980s. By 2005, his collection comprised more than 1,000 pieces, most by untrained artists such as Henry Darger, Steve Ashby and Sam Doyle. In 2008, he was named in Arts & Antiques magazine’s list of 250 "Top Collectors". He was president of Intuit (see above) from 1991 to 1996 and remains on the board of directors. The museum's Robert A. Roth Study Center is named in his honor. He is also a director and the principal owner of Raw Vision, the international journal of outsider art, based in London.
