= Joseph R. Kozenczak =

American police chief and investigator (1940–2015)

Chief of Police Joseph R. Kozenczak
- Born: March 20, 1940; Chicago, Illinois, U.S.
- Died: May 13, 2015 (aged 75); Park Ridge, Illinois, U.S.
- Police career
- Country: United States
- Department: Des Plaines Police Department
- Service years: 1962 – 1989
- Rank: Chief of Detectives from 1978–1980, Captain from 1980–1985, Chief of Police from 1985–1989.

Joseph R. Kozenczak (20 March 1940 – 13 May 2015) was the former Chief of Police of Des Plaines, Illinois where he worked for 27 years. After his retirement from police in 1989, he worked as a regional security director in the United States and Canada for TNT Express, Vice President of Investigations for John Reid and Associates, Criminal Justice Specialist for the State of Illinois, and practiced as an Illinois licensed private investigator.

He is recognized for his role of Lieutenant and Chief Investigator of the John Wayne Gacy serial murder investigation in 1978.

In June 1981, Kozenczak joined the FBI Academy. He would regularly participate in lectures; often delivered to students of criminology.

== Media ==
=== Film ===
- The made-for-TV film To Catch a Killer, starring Michael Riley as Kozenczak, was released in 1992. The film is largely based on the investigation of Gacy, following the disappearance of Robert Piest, by Des Plaines Police and their efforts to arrest him before the scheduled civil suit hearing on December 22.

=== Books ===
- The Chicago Killer, by Joseph R. Kozenczak and Karen M. Kozenczak (ISBN 978-1401095314).
