= Kripke =

Kripke is a surname. Notable people with the surname include:

- Dorothy K. Kripke (1912–2000), American author of Jewish educational books, and the mother of Saul Kripke
- Eric Kripke (born 1974), American television writer, director, and producer
- Madeline Kripke (1943–2020), American book collector
- Margaret L. Kripke, American immunologist
- Myer S. Kripke (1914–2014), American rabbi based in Omaha, Nebraska, and the husband of Dorothy K. Kripke
- Saul Kripke (1940–2022), American philosopher and logician

Fictional characters:

- Barry Kripke, a character in the sitcom The Big Bang Theory
