= History of the Jews in Omaha, Nebraska =

The history of the Jews in Omaha, Nebraska, goes back to the mid-1850s.

The Jewish community in Omaha, Nebraska, has made significant cultural, economic and social contributions to the city. The first Jewish settlers came to the city shortly after it was founded in 1856. The most numerous Jewish immigrants were from eastern Europe and the Russian Empire. They arrived in four waves of immigration to the US in the late 19th and early 20th centuries. Immigrants were active in working class and socialist politics, especially during the 1920s and 1930s. Others established themselves as merchants and businessmen in the city. The Jewish community supported philanthropy and created important cultural and charitable institutions. Born to socialist parents in Omaha, renowned Jewish feminist author Tillie Olsen worked when she was young in the meatpacking plants and helped organize unions. The Jewish youth organization Aleph Zadik Aleph was established by immigrants in Omaha.

Today there are many Jewish families who have lived in Omaha for four generations. These families have followed the expansion of the city to the west, with the center of their residential areas and synagogues having moved from Downtown Omaha and the Near North Side to the West Omaha suburbs. New Jewish immigrants have come to the city from Russia and Eastern Europe since the 1980s. Historically Omaha served as a point of migration for Jewish Americans who moved on to other cities. Today people from across the country can trace Omaha in their family histories.

== History ==
=== Pre-1900 ===
In 1856, the first Jewish settlers, mostly merchants and businessmen, arrived in Omaha. From the beginning, leaders of Orthodox Judaism and Reform Judaism worked to create strong congregations. In January 1871, Temple Israel was founded as the first Jewish congregation in Nebraska. Immediately afterwards, the congregation formed a burial society and established the Pleasant Hill Cemetery in order to provide ritual services to the city's Jewish community. The first confirmation service was held in 1872, and the congregation was incorporated with the city of Omaha in 1873.

In 1884 the congregation dedicated the first synagogue in Omaha at 23rd and Harney Streets. Later in the century Eastern European Jews immigrated to the city. In 1886, an Edict of Expulsion was enforced against the Jews of Kiev, which led many to migrate from Ukraine to the United States. Omaha became home to hundreds, as they settled in the older neighborhoods of the city.

By 1890 the federal census recorded 1,035 Jews in Omaha. In 1892, Temple Israel invited the newly ordained Rabbi Leo M. Franklin, a recent graduate of Hebrew Union College, to become their rabbi. Franklin immediately set about spurring changes aimed at strengthening Reform Judaism in the congregation, such as the adoption of the Union Prayer Book and the ritual recently endorsed by the Central Conference of American Rabbis. Franklin also pushed to increase the Building Fund, slated for the construction of a new and larger Temple for the Congregation. As time passed, Franklin gained a reputation as an eloquent and idealistic preacher. He won prominent admirers among Omaha's Christian community as well, such as William Jennings Bryan.

Franklin was active in work outside the Omaha congregation. He established a Reform congregation, B'nai Yeshurun, in Lincoln, Nebraska; helped found the first normal school in Nebraska for the training of religious teachers; served as the editor of the Omaha Humane Society's publication, and lectured in other cities (most notably Sioux City, Iowa). In 1896, the congregation elected Franklin to another five-year term as rabbi. Franklin's prominence led to an invitation to speak in Detroit, Michigan, in 1898. He was immediately offered the rabbinate at that city's Temple Beth El. Franklin accepted Beth El's offer, leaving Omaha in January, 1899. After his departure, Franklin remained in contact with his former Omaha congregation, and participated closely with planning and building of Temple Israel's new Temple, completed in 1908.

=== 1900-2000 ===
In the early 20th century, Anshe Sholom was a Hungarian congregation located in the Near North Side neighborhood, along with B'nai Jacob, a Conservative congregation. As generations of congregants passed on or moved out of the neighborhood, both congregations closed. Their cemeteries are next to that of Temple Israel on Pleasant Hill.

In 1911 a conversion held in Omaha provoked controversy in the Jewish world. Rabbi Zvi Hirsch Grodzenski, Omaha's Orthodox rabbi, published in the HaMassaf magazine that one butcher who lived in his city converted a girl for marriage to a Jewish guy, assuring her that after the conversion she would not have to keep any commandments at all. Rabbi Grodzensky ruled that the conversion was null and void. Rabbi Yechezkel Benat agreed that such conversions should not be made in the first place, but stated that the conversion is valid in any situation.

The J. L. Brandeis and Sons Store Building was opened by Brandeis, a notable member of Omaha's Jewish community, in 1906. Wise Memorial Hospital, named in honor of Rabbi Joseph M. Wise, was located at 406 South 24th Street on a lot donated by Brandeis's wife. Built in 1912 for $125,000, between 1912 and 1917 the hospital treated more than 1,000 patients. In 1930 the institution closed. The Louis Epstein family opened the first motion picture house between Chicago and Denver in 1911.

The Jewish Press began publication in 1920; it is still being published, and Omaha has the distinction of being the smallest community in the United States that is able to produce a weekly Jewish publication. In 1924 Omaha's Jewish community celebrated opening its own exclusive country club, Highland Country Club, in response to policies at established country clubs which excluded Jews. While social practices changed in the city among both Christian and Jewish Americans, Warren Buffett was one of the few non-Jewish members at Highland. He joined the club in 1968 to promote anti-discrimination. The Highland Country Club at Pacific and 132nd Streets was renamed Iron Wood in 2000. It no longer specified Jewish-only membership, just as most other country clubs no longer excluded Jewish Americans or other minorities. Ironwood officially closed at the end of December 2009 due to financial woes.

The Omaha Jewish Community Center was founded two years after the country club, in 1926. The JCC moved to its present location at 333 South 132nd Street in 1973. The original JCC was the site of important labor organizing in the city, and has continued to serve as an important center for financial support in Omaha's Jewish community throughout its history.

The 1930 U.S. census showed 2,084 Jewish Russians in Omaha, many of whom were first-generation immigrants who had fled religious persecution in the Russian Empire (including Ukraine). In 1929 a Conservative congregation began holding services at the Jewish Community Center on 20th and Dodge Streets. Beth El bought land for its cemetery in 1927. In 1935 the group named itself the Beth El Congregation. During Hanukkah in 1941, they dedicated a new synagogue facing 49th Avenue at Farnam Street. After fifty years of almost continuous growth, Beth El dedicated a new synagogue in 1991 at 14506 California Street in West Omaha, a more suburban location, where most of their congregants had migrated over the years to get newer housing.

Beth Hamedrosh Hagadol Cemetery is in Sarpy County, next to Hrabik Cemetery and the Bnai Abraham Cemetery. Today all three are referred to as the Fisher Farm Cemetery. They were originally established in 1883 by a now-defunct congregation called Bennea Israel.

Jewish businessmen created much of the commercial development in the Near North Side, especially the important North 24th Street corridor. After helping establish the prominence of the area before World War I, many Jewish merchants maintained their businesses even after the neighborhood was redlined in the 1920s. Housing discrimination forced African-American residents to stay in the community, but especially after World War II, many descendants of other ethnicities moved from the area to the western suburbs of Omaha to live in newer housing. Such suburban development was typical around growing cities in the postwar years.

Jewish businesses left North Omaha only in the late 1960s after their businesses were targeted and destroyed in urban riots. Most Jewish residents had already gradually moved to West Omaha and other neighborhoods. In 1968, there were 7,000 Jews living in Omaha. By the second decade of the 21st century the Jewish population was approximately 6,000.

== Notable Jewish Omahans ==
Aaron Cahn was a prominent Jewish member in the Omaha community who served in the first Nebraska State Legislature. His family were among the first Jewish settlers in Omaha.

In the early 1900s, Edward Rosewater, a Bohemian Jew from Hungary, founded the Omaha Bee and served as its editor. His strong stands sometimes stirred controversy. Notable Rabbi Leo M. Franklin served Temple Israel from 1892 to 1898. Arthur J. Lelyveld, leader of the Hillel organization and president of the Zionist Organization of America, was a rabbi in Omaha for several years.

Born in North Omaha, Tillie Olsen was a worker and labor organizer in the 1930s in the meatpacking industry, helping organize the United Packinghouse Workers of America in the South Omaha stockyards and packinghouses. She was much influenced by her parents' Jewish socialist community in North Omaha, and was an activist all her life. Later Olsen began to publish her writings (after her move to California). She became an influential feminist author and served as writer-in-residence at several universities.

By the mid-20th century, Jewish people achieved formal elective office in Omaha. Edward Zorinsky was elected mayor of Omaha and served from 1973 to 1976. After that he was elected United States Senator from 1976 to 1987.

Meyer S. Kripke was an American rabbi, scholar, and philanthropist. He served as Rabbi for Omaha Beth El from 1946-1990.

Henry Monsky was a B'nai B'rith leader from Omaha. Aleph Zadik Aleph, the men's Order of the B'nai B'rith Youth Organization began in Omaha in 1923 as a college fraternity.

Additional notable Jewish Americans from Omaha:

- Dinah Abrahamson (1954–2013) - author/politician
- Max Baer (1909–1959) - world boxing champion
- Rose Blumkin (1893–1998) - founder of the Nebraska Furniture Mart
- Julius Cherniss - great-grandfather of Harold F. Cherniss (1904–1987), Plato scholar at Princeton
- Marti Epstein (1959) - musician/composer
- Bryan Greenberg (1978) - actor
- Bennett Greenspan (1952) - co-founder of Family TreeDNA
- Zvi Hirsch Grodzinsky (1857–1947) - rabbi
- Michael Ivins (1963) - bassist
- Arlene Klasky (1949) - animator, co-founder of Klasky Csupo
- Lawrence Klein (1920) - economist
- Dorothy K. Kripke (1912–2000) - author
- Myer S. Kripke (1914–2014) - Rabb and philanthropist
- Saul Kripke (1940-2022) - philosopher and logician
- Hannah Logasa (1879–1967) - librarian and author
- Clara Ruth Mozzor (1892 – after 1937) - lawyer, clubwoman
- Jule M. Newman (1893–1991) - founder of Hinky Dinky grocery chain
- Johnny Rosenblatt (1907–1979) - Omaha mayor (1954–1961)
- Brian Teacher (1954) - tennis player
- Louis Wirth (1897–1952) - sociologist
- Edward Zorinsky (1928-1987) - U.S. Senator from Nebraska, Mayor of Omaha

== Synagogues ==
Synagogues in Omaha
Name	Affiliation	Address	Link
B'nai Israel Synagogue (unaffiliated)		618 Mynster Street, Council Bluffs	link
Beth El Synagogue	Conservative	14506 California Street	link
Beth Israel Synagogue	Orthodox	12604 Pacific Street	link
Capehart Chapel		Offutt Air Force Base	link
Chabad House	Chabad-Lubavitch	1866 South 120th Street	link
Simon Family Chapel, Rose Blumkin Jewish Home		323 South 132nd Street	
Temple Israel Synagogue	Reform	13111 Sterling Ridge Drive	link

Former synagogues in Omaha
Name	Opened	Closed	Address	Notes
B'nai Israel	1872	Open	Park Ave and Johnson Street	Located at 1502 N. 52nd St. in 1952. B'nai Israel founded Pleasant Hill Cemetery at 6412 North 42nd Street in 1872. In 1889, B’nai Israel became Temple Israel.
Beth Israel	1885	?	18th and Chicago	
Chevra B'nai Israel Adas Russia	1886	?	12th and Capitol| Russian; also known as "The Kippler Shul"; moved to 18th and Chicago in 1910.	
Beth Hamedrosh Hagadol, aka, was built.	1883			AKA "The Litvsche Shul"
Union of Orthodox Congregations of Omaha	1883			B’nai Israel and Beth Hamedrosh Hagadol merged to form the UOC.
Beth Hamedrash Hagodol	1890			
B’nai Jacob Anshe Sholom	1909			A Hungarian synagogue originally located at 1111 N. 24th St., 25th and Seward, then 6412 N. 42nd St.
B’nai Jacob – Adas Yeshuron	1906			AKA "The Kapulier Shul", incorporated at 19th and Beast St., then 24th and Nicholas, and then 3028 Cuming St.
Beth Hamedrosh Adas Yeshuran	1922		25th and Seward	
Shaare Zion	1926			AKA “the Riekes Shul”
1929—Beth El Synagogue	1929	Open	Located at 1821 North 20th Street, then 1552 N. 19th St. in 1939	Services held at the Jewish Community Center at 20th and Dodge, located at 49th and Farnam in 1952
B’nai Jacob Adas Yeshurun	1952			
B'nai Jacob Anshe Sholem, closed permanently		1985		

== Cemeteries ==
Jewish cemeteries in Omaha
Name	Address	Established	Notes
Beth El Synagogue Cemetery	4700 South 84th Street		The land for this cemetery was bought in 1927.
Beth Hamedrosh Hagodol Cemetery	8600 South 42 Street, Bellevue	1901	Abbreviated to B.H.H.
Golden Hill Cemetery	5025 North 42nd Street	1888	
Hrabik Cemetery	8600 South 42 Street, Bellevue		
Mount Sinai Cemetery	8600 South 42 Street, Bellevue		
Oak Hills Cemetery	Council Bluffs		
Pleasant Hill Cemetery	6412 North 42 Street	1871	

== See also ==
- List of churches in Omaha
- List of cemeteries in Omaha

== Bibliography ==
- Pollak, O.B. (2001) Jewish Life in Omaha and Lincoln: A Photographic History. Arcadia Publishing.
- Fletcher Sasse, Adam (2021) "A History of Antisemitism in Omaha", NorthOmahaHistory.com.
