= Beth Hamedrash Hagodol (disambiguation) =

Beth Hamedrash Hagodol (Hebrew for "Great House of Learning") may refer to the following:

- Beth HaMedrosh Hagodol-Beth Joseph (Denver, Colorado), an Orthodox synagogue
- Beth Hamedrash Hagodol Synagogue (Hartford, Connecticut), a former synagogue, now church
- Beth Hamedrosh Hagodol Cemetery (Bellevue, Nebraska), a cemetery
- Beth Hamedrash Hagadol (Newark, New Jersey), a demolished synagogue
- Beth Hamedrash Hagodol (Manhattan, New York), a closed synagogue, demolished in 2017

== See also ==
- Beth midrash
- Beth Medrash Govoha
- Beth Medrash Elyon
