= Golden Hill Jewish Cemetery =

Cemetery in Douglas County, Nebraska

Golden Hill Cemetery
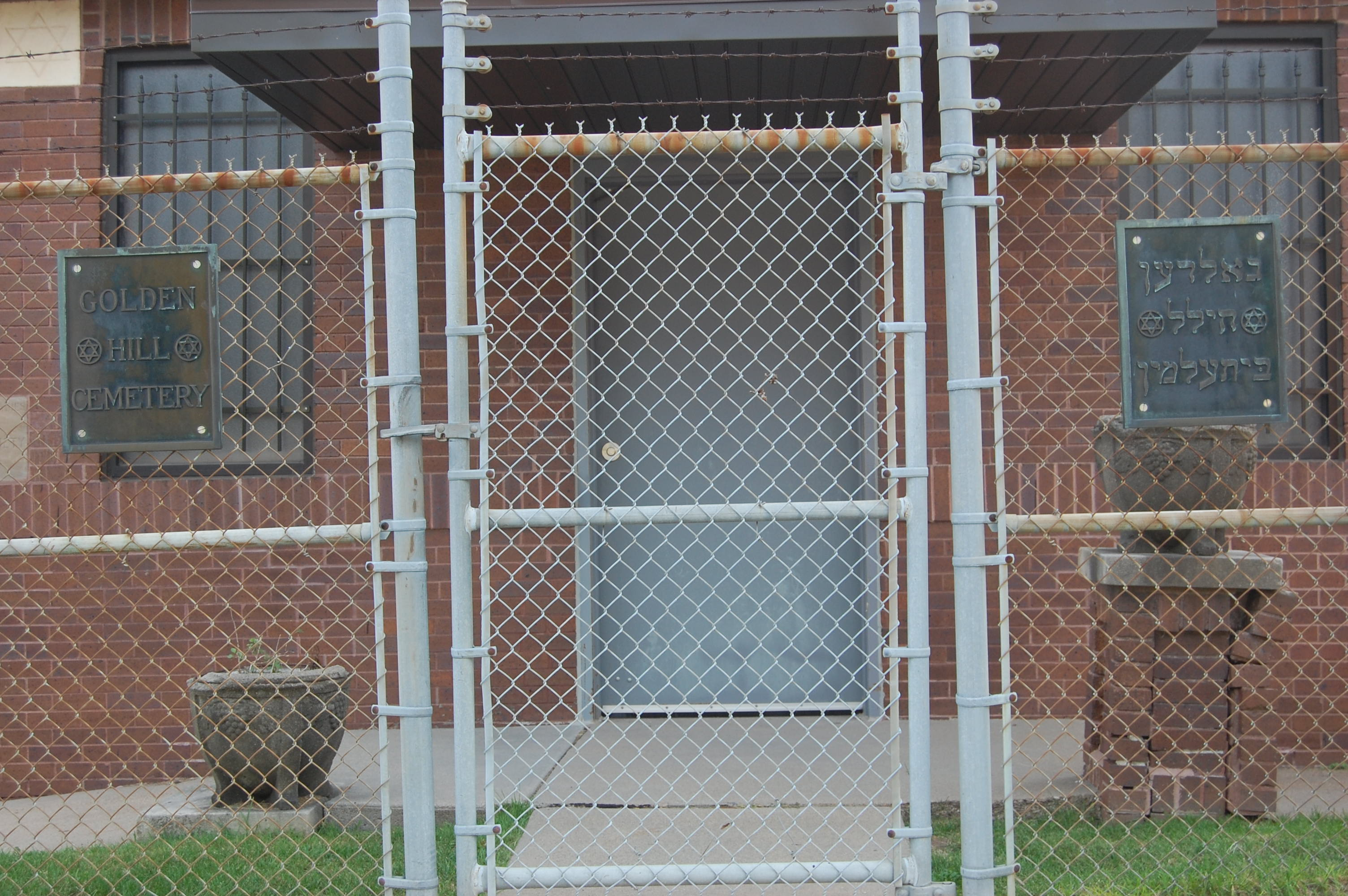
- The front gates of Golden Hill Cemetery, Omaha, Nebraska
- Interactive map of Golden Hill Cemetery

Details
- Established: 1888
- Location: Omaha, Nebraska
- Country: United States
- Coordinates: 41°18′18″N 95°58′29″W
- Type: Jewish
- Owned by: Beth Israel Synagogue
- Find a Grave: Golden Hill Cemetery

Golden Hill Cemetery is located at 5025 North 42nd Street in the North Omaha neighborhood of Omaha, Nebraska.

== History ==
The Chevra B'nai Israel Adas Russia purchased the land as a Jewish cemetery in 1888.

The cemetery is part of the Orthodox Jewish community of Omaha. It is a small cemetery that takes up about one city block and is relatively full. A circular drive runs down the center of the cemetery.

== Notable burials ==
- Rose Blumkin (1893–1998), the founder of the Nebraska Furniture Mart
- The cemetery also has graves for Jewish soldiers and officers from Omaha who were killed in World War I, World War II, and other wars

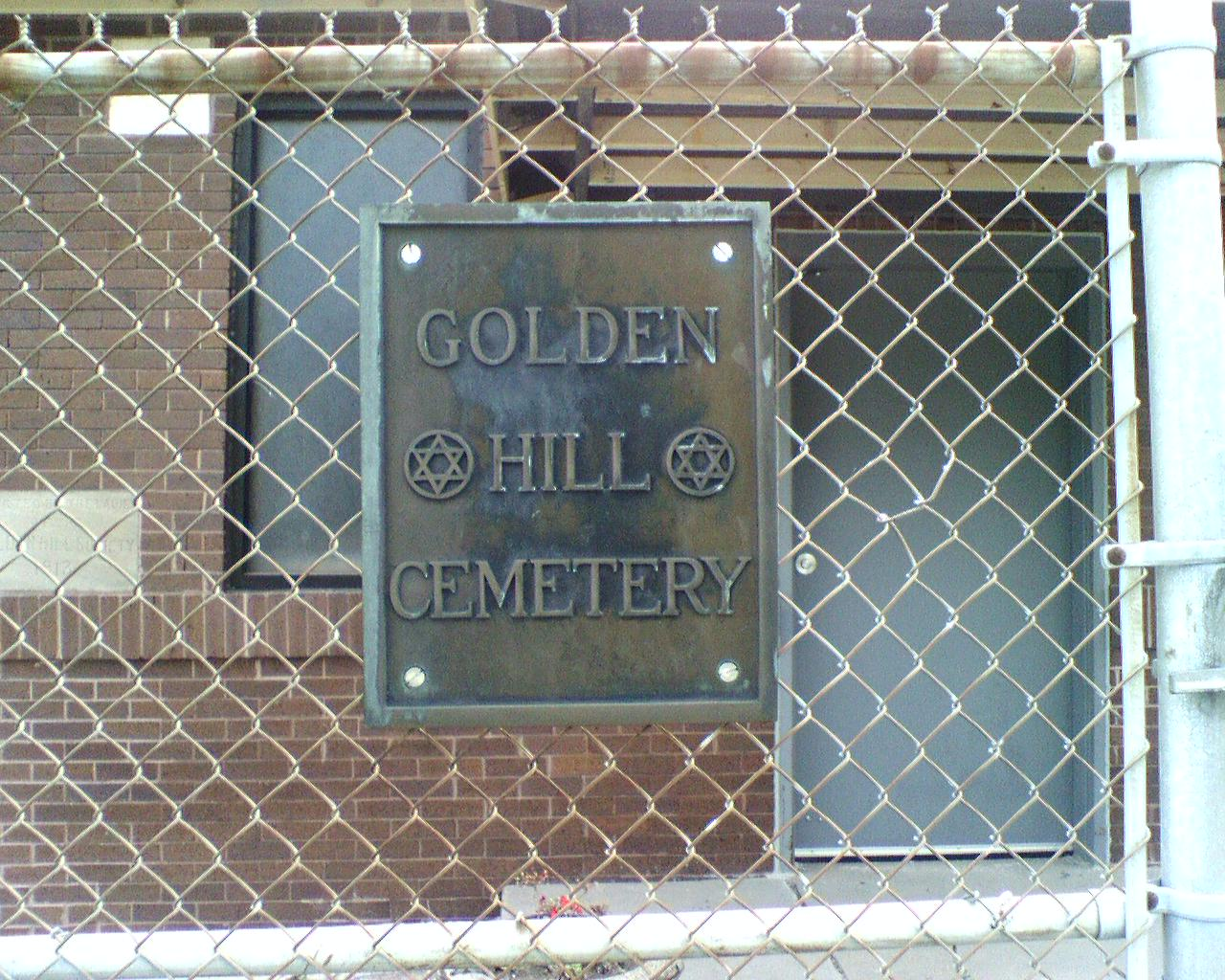
Golden Hill Cemetery in Omaha, NE (English sign to left of gate)

== See also ==
- History of the Jews in Omaha, Nebraska
- List of cemeteries in Omaha
- History of Omaha

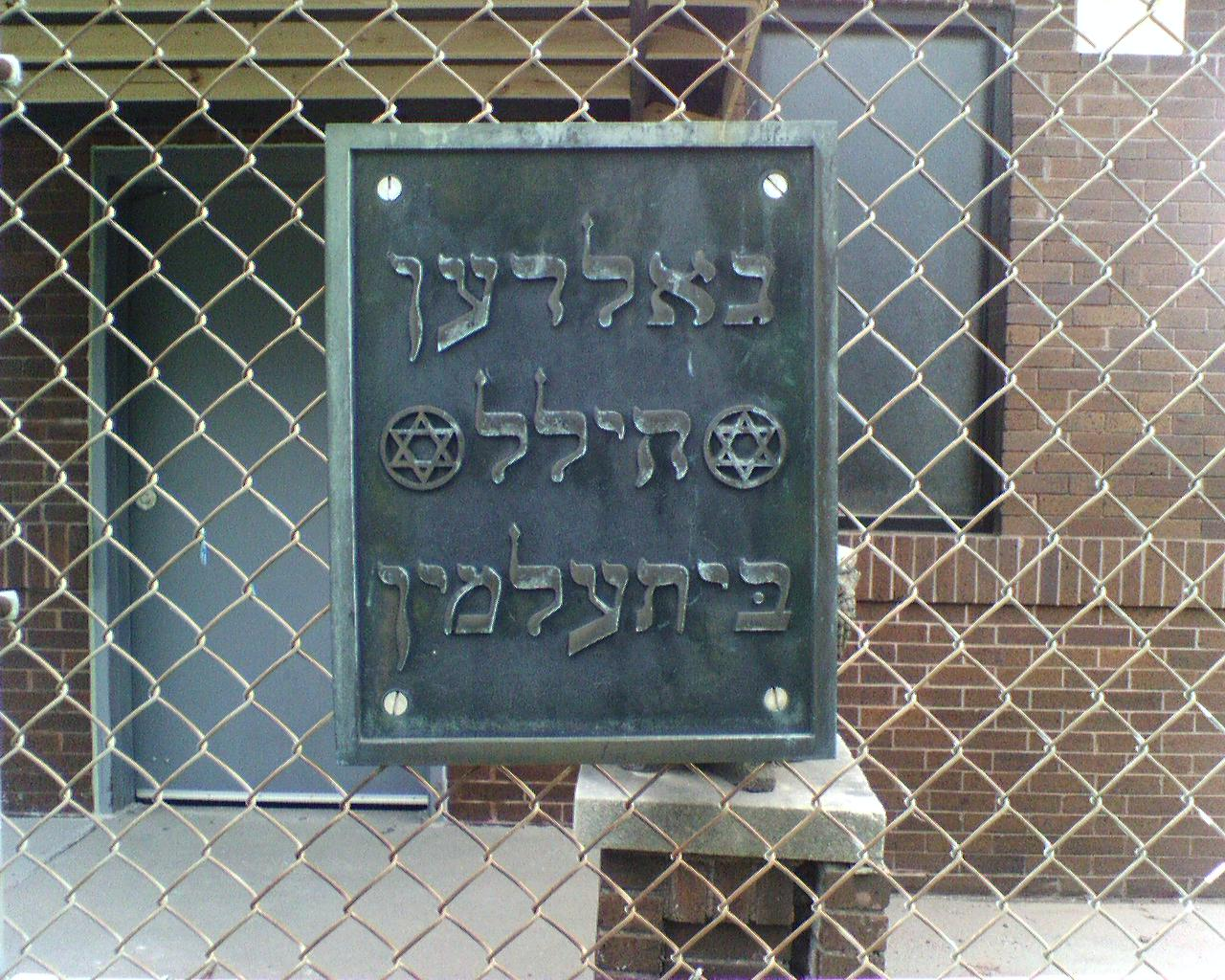
Golden Hill Cemetery in Omaha, NE (Hebrew sign to right of gate)
