= Laurel Hill Cemetery (disambiguation) =

Laurel Hill Cemetery is a cemetery in Philadelphia, Pennsylvania.

Laurel Hill Cemetery may also refer to:

- Laurel Hill Cemetery, Omaha, Nebraska
- Laurel Hill Cemetery (Saco, Maine)
- Laurel Hill Cemetery (San Francisco)

== See also ==
- West Laurel Hill Cemetery, in Bala Cynwyd, Pennsylvania
- Laurel Cemetery, Baltimore, Maryland
- Laurel Hill (disambiguation)
