= Murder of Timothy McCoy =

1972 murder in Norwood Park, Chicago, Illinois, U.S.

Timothy McCoy
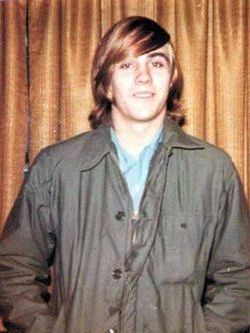
- McCoy in December 1971
- Born: Timothy Jack McCoy; May 14, 1955; Council Bluffs, Iowa, U.S.
- Disappeared: January 2, 1972; Chicago, Illinois, U.S.
- Died: January 3, 1972 (aged 16); Chicago, Illinois, U.S.
- Cause of death: Multiple stab wounds to the chest
- Body discovered: December 26, 1978; Chicago, Illinois, U.S.
- Resting place: Westlawn-Hillcrest Funeral Home and Memorial Park, Omaha, Nebraska, U.S. 41.1406°N 95.5956°W (approximate)
- Other names: Body 9 Case #1279 Dec. 78; The Greyhound Bus Boy
- Height: 5 ft 11 in (1.80 m) (approximate)

Timothy Jack McCoy (May 14, 1955 – January 3, 1972) was an American teenager from Omaha, Nebraska. He is the first known victim of serial killer and sex offender John Wayne Gacy, who raped, tortured and murdered at least 33 young men and boys in Norwood Park Township, near Chicago, Illinois, between 1972 and 1978.

McCoy encountered Gacy at Chicago's Greyhound bus terminal in the early hours of January 3, 1972, while he waited for a connecting bus to his father's home in Nebraska due the following noon. He was lured to Gacy's home and subsequently stabbed to death. His body was later buried in the crawl space beneath the property, and was only recovered following Gacy's December 1978 arrest, although his body remained unidentified until May 1986.

Following his 1986 identification, McCoy's remains were returned to his family. His body was interred alongside his father at Westlawn-Hillcrest Funeral Home and Memorial Park in his home state of Nebraska.

Prior to his identification, McCoy was informally known as the Greyhound Bus Boy and officially as both Body 9 and Case #1279 Dec. 78. His informal moniker was a reference to the Chicago Greyhound bus terminal where he first encountered Gacy and how his murderer largely chose to refer to him; his formal monikers refer to his sequential recovery order from beneath Gacy's property and his assigned medical examiner reference number.

== Early life ==
Timothy Jack McCoy was born in Council Bluffs, Iowa, on May 14, 1955, the third of four children born to Jack and Norma "Susie" (née Study) McCoy. He had two older sisters, Cynthia and Linda, and a younger brother, Terry. His father was a laborer and country and western singer, whereas his mother was a homemaker.

The McCoy family frequently relocated throughout America throughout Timothy's life, with the family variously living in Iowa, Nebraska and Florida in addition to frequently traveling across state lines to locations such as Missouri to visit relatives. On one occasion, Jack McCoy relocated his family to California in the hope of securing a record deal, although one of the McCoy daughters soon developed a severe respiratory disease, resulting in the family returning to Iowa. In the early 1970s, Jack and Norma—then residing in Florida—divorced, with Norma soon remarrying and gradually returning to Iowa. Both daughters had left the household by this stage; as such, only Timothy and Terry remained at home. Terry chose to live with his mother, whereas Timothy remained with his father following the divorce. Shortly thereafter, Jack McCoy and his older son returned to Nebraska. Months later, Timothy obtained a false ID and secured employment as a forklift operator in nearby Council Bluffs.

Timothy was a fan of rock music, with his favorite album being Cosmo's Factory by Creedence Clearwater Revival, whom he is believed to have seen perform live at Woodstock in August 1969. One of his cousins, Jeffrey Billings, described Timothy as "one of them guys that, when you were around him, he was happy, he'd make you laugh", adding that "he always had something to say."

== Christmas 1971 ==
Shortly before Christmas 1971, Timothy visited his cousins in Lansing, Michigan; he spent the Christmas holidays and New Year's Day 1972 at this location, engaging in activities such as snowball fights, riding with relatives in the family's snowmobile and creating a homemade festive 8mm camera movie. On Christmas Day, Timothy received a new belt buckle engraved with the outline of a Ford Model A car as a gift from his cousins; he wore this buckle for the remainder of his visit.

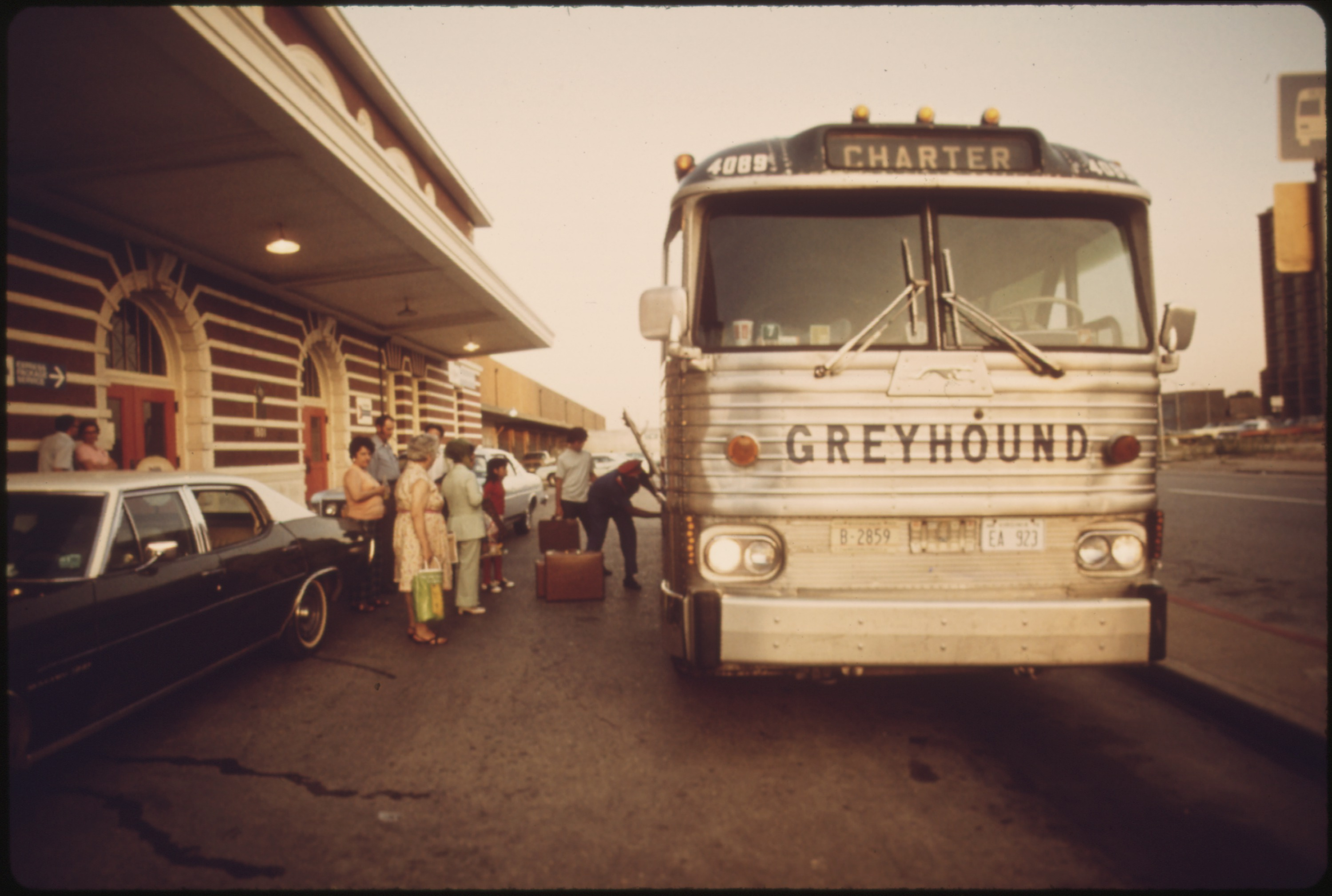
A 1970s model Greyhound bus. McCoy was last seen by family members aboard a vehicle similar to this on January 2, 1972.

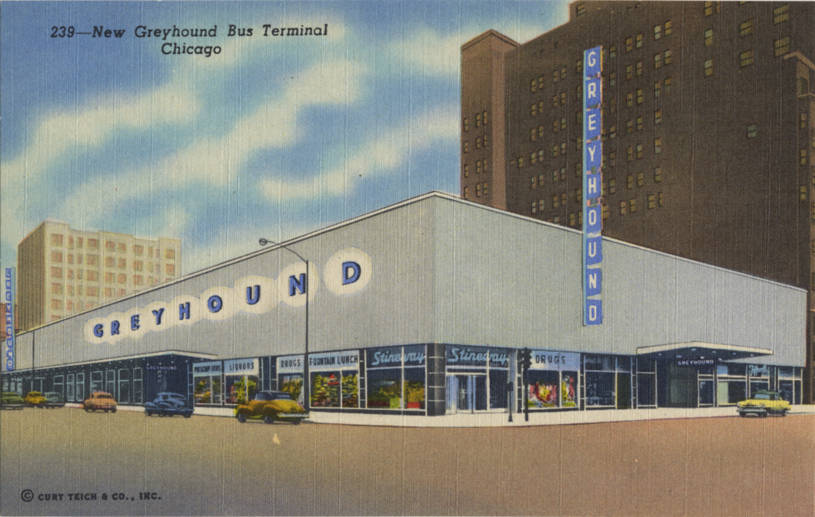
Chicago's Greyhound bus terminal, seen here as it appeared in the 1950s

Timothy's teenage cousin, Beverly Billings, would later recollect that in the final days of 1971, several of her female friends expressed an interest in Timothy, causing him to joke he should perhaps relocate to Michigan.

The day after New Year's Day 1972, Timothy's cousins and their parents dropped him off at the Capital Area Multimodal Gateway in East Lansing, with view to his catching a Greyhound bus to Omaha via Chicago. Prior to boarding the bus, Timothy promised his relatives he would call them once he reached his aunt's house in Iowa. According to his relatives, they watched Timothy board the bus, then wave at them through the window as the vehicle began its interstate journey. They never saw or heard from him again.

=== Arrival in Chicago ===
Timothy arrived in Chicago sometime late in the evening of January 2. His connecting bus was not scheduled to depart until noon of the following day, which gave him some time to spend in Chicago. As he wandered within and around the station with little or nothing to occupy his time, he encountered an individual who pulled his car to the curb, then wound down the driver's-side window of his car and asked Timothy what he was doing. The driver was John Wayne Gacy.

"The party started breaking up at about 12:30 a.m. I wasn't tired so I thought I'd go looking around. I went down to the Civic Center to look at the ice sculptures, but then, after I seen 'em, I got back in my car ... So I drove around the block and pulled up in front of [the Greyhound bus depot] ... that's when I seen the kid. He had, I think, Levis on and some, uh, sort of lumberjack jacket-type thing. So we [rode around], down State Street. The State Street lights ... all beautiful. We went to my house ... I'd say around two in the morning."

— John Wayne Gacy, recollecting how he first encountered Timothy McCoy to journalist Russ Ewing (1985).

=== Encounter with Gacy ===
Gacy later recollected that after introducing himself to Timothy and asking his business, the teenager replied with a comment to the effect of: "I ain't doing nothing. I got twelve hours to kill." Gacy then offered the teenager an impromptu sightseeing tour of the city after learning Timothy was from out of state and that his bus was not due for several hours—an offer Timothy accepted.

According to Gacy, after driving around the city and describing several local landmarks to Timothy, the teenager expressed that he was hungry and agreed to accompany him to his home in Norwood Park Township, with Gacy promising the teenager food and stating that as he currently had the house to himself, (Note: Gacy's fiancée, Carole Hoff, and his two stepdaughters were visiting relatives in Kennicott Grove between New Year's Eve 1971 and early January 1972.) he could spend the night in the spare bedroom and be driven to the bus station in the morning in time to catch his connecting bus.

Gacy prepared a lunch meat sandwich for Timothy, which the teenager ate in the living room before accepting "a couple of" shots of neat clear grain alcohol as Gacy drank a beer. The conversation between the two then turned to sex. Despite the fact that Timothy is known to have been heterosexual, Gacy claimed the two then "got into oral sex, both ways." If Gacy's accounts of a sexual encounter between the two are true, it remains unknown whether these were consensual acts.

Shortly thereafter, Gacy told the teenager he "[felt] tired"; he told Timothy he could sleep in the spare bedroom and that he would drive him to the bus station in time to catch his connecting bus. The two then went to sleep in separate bedrooms of the property.

== Murder ==
Although Gacy's accounts regarding his encounter with Timothy and the events to occur at his home prior to falling asleep were largely consistent, his accounts of the events following his awaking on the morning of January 3 varied. Initially, he claimed that "around four in the morning" he awoke to observe the silhouetted teenager standing in the doorway to his bedroom, backlit from the light in a room across the hallway, holding the same knife he had used to carve the sandwich meat in his kitchen hours earlier in his hand, that he had leaped from his bed in an instinctive state of panic and self-defense, that the two had fought and that in the ensuing struggle, Timothy had fatally fallen on the knife. He would later revise this statement to claim he had leaped from his bed and charged at the teenager, who had seemed both surprised and frightened at his impulsive reaction.

In Gacy's revised account of the events of the morning of January 3, Timothy had been walking towards his bed with the knife in his hand at approximately 7:30 a.m.; he had instinctively held up the knife to protect himself as Gacy jumped from his bed and reached for his wrist, accidentally cutting Gacy's arm as the teenager asked, "What are you doing?" (Note: Gacy had a scar on his arm to support this account. This wound is known to have been first observed by his older sister, Joanne, at a family wake on the afternoon of January 3.) After observing the slash wound to his arm, Gacy claimed to have "felt a surge of power from my toes to my brain"; he then grabbed Timothy and threw him against the wall, causing him to drop the knife and slide to the floor. The teenager then kicked Gacy in the stomach, doubling him over. Gacy then shouted, "Motherfucker! I'll kill you!" before straddling the teenager and repeatedly stabbing him in the chest—experiencing an orgasm as he did so.

As Timothy lay dying, Gacy washed the knife in the bathroom sink, then walked into the kitchen to place the knife "where it belonged" as he listened to the "never-ending gurgulations" emanating from the bedroom. Here, he saw a carton of eggs and a slab of unsliced bacon on the counter and that the teenager had set the table for two. Timothy had simply intended to walk into Gacy's bedroom to wake him while absentmindedly carrying the knife.

Reflecting on his revised account of Timothy's death in the mid-1980s, Gacy remarked: "See? He wasn't trying to outsmart me at all; he was trying to do something nice."

=== Burial ===
After Timothy succumbed to his knife wounds, Gacy cleaned all traces of blood from the crime scene, then dragged the teenager's body to the crawl space beneath his home before gathering, then disposing of his clothing and personal possessions. He then drove to a scheduled family wake for his Aunt Pearl, who had died of natural causes at age 74 four days previously.

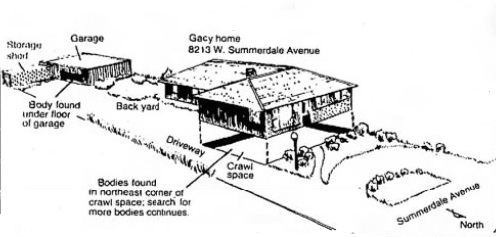
Diagram of Gacy's Norwood Park residence, depicting the dimensions of his crawl space where twenty-six of his victims were buried

Gacy later dug a shallow grave close to a support pillar in the crawl space and buried Timothy's remains face-down in this location. (Note: In reference to his decision to bury Timothy's body in his crawl space, Gacy would state in 1985: "It was just a nicely kept secret ... Nobody knew about it.") Six months later, Gacy married his fiancée, who repeatedly complained of a foul odor emanating from the crawl space and the presence of gnats in the utility room, which Gacy alternately blamed on dead mice and a likely broken sewer pipe. He periodically spread bags of lime in the crawl space in efforts to both combat the odor and hasten decomposition before covering the grave with a 4" thick layer of concrete on an occasion his wife and stepdaughters were visiting relatives in late 1972.

=== Initial investigation ===
By prearrangement, on the afternoon of January 3, Timothy's aunt drove to the bus depot in Omaha to pick up her nephew. Although the bus Timothy was expected to arrive upon arrived on schedule, her nephew was not among the departing passengers. A phone call to relatives in Lansing confirmed Timothy had boarded a bus at the Capital Area Multimodal Gateway the previous day.

As the year progressed, Timothy's family became increasingly concerned as they heard nothing further from him as although the teenager was somewhat footloose, he was close to his family, had never run away from home, and invariably maintained contact with his relatives. His father ultimately hired a Chicago-based private investigator, who was unable to establish any firm leads as to Timothy's whereabouts. Nonetheless, as the teenager had traveled extensively across America in his lifetime, some relatives held onto hope he had simply chosen to continue traveling across the country on his own and would someday re-initiate contact.

In March 1973, Timothy's grandfather, Bain Study, died of natural causes in Iowa at the age of 82. When Timothy failed to show up at the funeral, these members of his family also lost all hope that he would ever return.

== Arrest ==
John Wayne Gacy was arrested as a result of the investigation into the abduction and murder of his thirty-third known victim, 15-year-old Robert Piest. His arrest occurred on December 21, 1978—ten days after Piest's abduction from a Des Plaines pharmacy.

Des Plaines investigators had obtained further details of Gacy's criminal background throughout the course of their investigation into Piest's disappearance. Their investigation had linked Gacy to the disappearances of three Illinois teenagers in addition to the fact he had been imprisoned in Iowa in 1968 for the sodomy of a 15-year-old boy—for which he had been paroled in 1970—and had an outstanding assault and battery charge impending pertaining to a further assault on a young man.

A second warrant to search Gacy's property was granted to Des Plaines investigators on December 21, 1978. Within minutes of technicians entering the crawl space, the first human bones and sections of adipocere were discovered beneath the property.

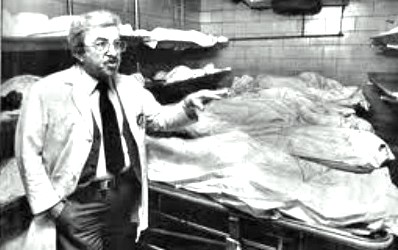
Cook County Medical Examiner Dr. Robert Stein, pictured in the Cook County morgue on December 29, 1978

=== Exhumations ===
Between December 1978 and March 1979, twenty-nine victims were discovered buried upon Gacy's property. Four other victims were discovered in the Des Plaines River. Timothy's remains were the eighth set to be recovered from the crawl space and the ninth recovered from his property; his body was located at 2:26 p.m. on December 26 beneath a slab of concrete alongside the eastern support pillar of Gacy's home. His body was discovered face-down, with the skull facing to the south of the property. The only clothing recovered from the grave was a section of elastic sourcing from a pair of underwear, a distinctive Ford Model A belt buckle, and a pair of socks. An autopsy revealed numerous striations upon the rib cage and sternum consistent with a death by stabbing.

== Conviction of perpetrator ==
Gacy was brought to trial on February 6, 1980, charged with thirty-three counts of murder and one respective count of indecent liberties with a child and deviate sexual assault, both in relation to the murder of his final victim. Upon advice from his defense counsel, Gacy pleaded not guilty by reason of insanity. He was found guilty of all charges on March 13 and sentenced to death for each of the twelve murders committed after the Illinois statute on capital punishment came into effect in June 1977.

Following his conviction, Gacy was transferred to the Menard Correctional Center, where he remained on death row for 14 years. He was executed by lethal injection at the Stateville Correctional Center on May 10, 1994, at age 52.

== Funeral ==
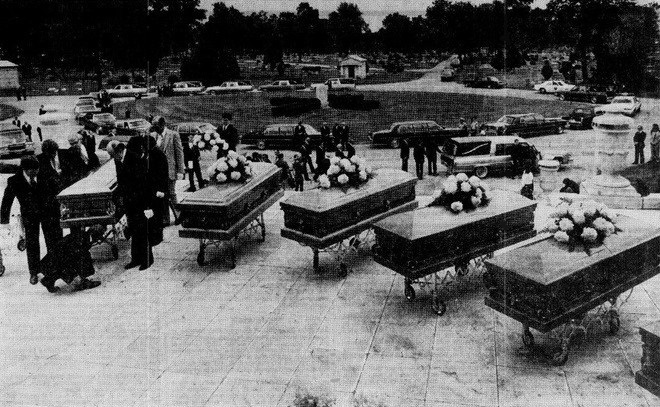
The 1981 memorial service conducted for the nine unidentified victims of John Wayne Gacy.

By 1980, only twenty-four of Gacy's thirty-three victims had been identified. The following year, the nine unidentified victims of Gacy—then-including Timothy McCoy—were laid to rest in separate Chicago cemeteries following a service conducted outside the Oakridge Cemetery mausoleum in Hillside, Illinois. Each identical copper-colored casket was donated by local funeral directors. At the service, Cook County Medical Examiner Dr. Robert Stein issued a final plea for the parents of the remaining unidentified victims to come forward to identify their sons, stating: "I don't want [your sons] to go to [their] resting place as just so many numbers." He concluded his eulogy by stating the efforts to identify the victims were "not over yet. At least, I hope [they are] not over." The inscriptions upon each of the unmarked tombstones read: "We Remembered" followed by their interment date of June 12, 1981.

Each funeral was provided free by members of the funeral service industry, with the executive secretary of the Funeral Directors Services Association, Tom Moriarty, stating the location of each burial site would not be disclosed to the media in order to prevent the graves from becoming macabre tourist attractions.

=== Subsequent developments ===
In February 1986, one of Timothy's cousins, Beverly Howe (née Billings), read an excerpt of Tim Cahill's newly released book focusing on the life and crimes of John Wayne Gacy, Buried Dreams: Inside the Mind of a Serial Killer. This excerpt focused on the circumstances surrounding the abduction and murder of his first victim—referred to by Gacy as the "Greyhound Bus Boy"—and Howe immediately drew correlations between the decedent and her missing cousin, whom she had been among the final relatives to see alive as he boarded a Greyhound bus at the Capital Area Multimodal Gateway the day prior to Gacy's accounts of the murder.

Howe and several other relatives had previously suspected Gacy's potential involvement in Timothy's disappearance upon learning of his crimes following his arrest; they had erroneously believed a relative had submitted his dental records to the Cook County Medical Examiner in 1979. Strongly suspecting that Timothy was the individual Gacy had specifically described as his first victim, the family initiated telephone contact with author Tim Cahill, who agreed to travel to East Lansing to speak with them in person. Within the interview, Howe specifically recalled the correlations between her cousin's disappearance and Gacy's accounts of when and where he encountered his first victim; she also outlined how she had given Timothy a distinctive belt buckle engraved with a vintage Ford Model A car as a Christmas present eight days prior to his disappearance and how the teenager had invariably worn the gift while in Michigan. Shortly thereafter, Cahill and journalist Russ Ewing embarked on a nationwide hunt to locate Timothy's dental records, which Ewing successfully located in Florida. These records were given to the Cook County Medical Examiner in the spring of 1986.

== Identification ==
Timothy Jack McCoy's body was formally identified via his dental records on May 9, 1986. The Cook County orthodontist and chief of forensic science who confirmed Timothy's identity, Dr. John Pavlik, stated the fillings upon the ninth victim exhumed from beneath Gacy's property were "very unique" and consistent with dental surgery conducted upon only two to three percent of the American population. (Note: Three further victims of John Wayne Gacy have since been identified: William George Bundy (19), previously known as Body 19; James Byron Haakenson (16), previously known as Body 24; and Francis Wayne Alexander (21), previously known as Body 5. Five victims still remain unidentified.)

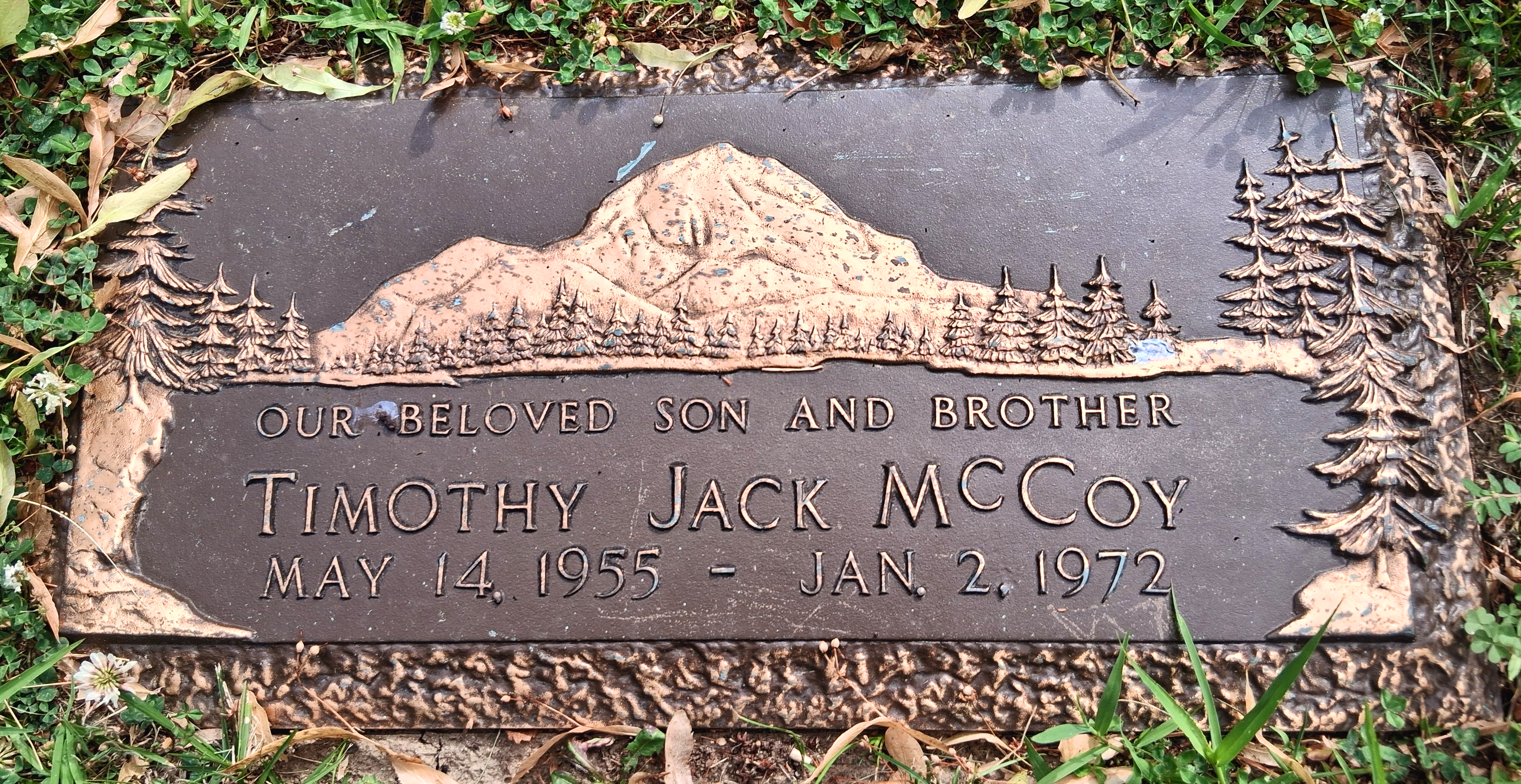
McCoy's headstone at Westlawn-Hillcrest Funeral Home and Memorial Park. He was laid to rest in this cemetery on May 25, 1986.

Following Timothy's identification, his family discovered that one of his aunts—who had been entrusted with submitting Timothy's dental records to the Cook County Medical Examiner in 1979—had actually failed to do so for fear of causing the family heartbreak should Timothy have been confirmed as a victim.

=== Second funeral ===
Shortly after Timothy's identification, his remains were exhumed and returned to his immediate family in Glenwood, Iowa. He was laid to rest within the Westlawn-Hillcrest Funeral Home and Memorial Park in Omaha, Nebraska, on May 25, 1986, in a ceremony attended by numerous family members. Timothy was laid to rest in a plot directly beside his father, Jack, who had died at age 53 in July 1983.

In 2017, one of Timothy's siblings, Linda, reflected that, of all her family members, her brother's disappearance had "hurt [his] father the most" and that, in some ways, she was glad he had died prior to the identification of his oldest son as he "never had to know" the circumstances surrounding Timothy's death. Timothy's tombstone reads: "Our Beloved Son And Brother. Timothy Jack McCoy." His name is inscribed beneath a golden mountain. (Note: Timothy McCoy's tombstone erroneously lists his date of death as January 2, 1972; he was murdered on the morning of January 3, 1972.)

== See also ==
- Cold case
- Crime in Illinois
- List of homicides in Illinois
- List of kidnappings (1970–1979)
- List of murdered American children
- List of solved missing person cases (1970s)
- Unidentified decedent

== Cited works and further reading ==
- Amirante, Sam L.; Broderick, Danny (2011). John Wayne Gacy: Defending a Monster. Skyhorse. ISBN 978-1-61608-248-2.
- Berry-Dee, Christopher (2009). Born Killers: Childhood Secrets of the World's Deadliest Serial Killers. John Blake. ISBN 978-1-85782-648-7.
- Borowski, John (2020). John Gacy: Hunting a Predator. Waterfront. ISBN 978-0-997-61406-0.
- Cahill, Tim (1993) [1986]. Buried Dreams: Inside the Mind of a Serial Killer. Bantam Books. ISBN 978-1-857-02084-7. OCLC 12421532.
- Evans, Colin (1996). The Casebook of Forensic Detection: How Science Solved 100 of the World's Most Baffling Crimes. Wiley. ISBN 978-0-471-07650-6.
- Foreman, Laura (1992). Serial Killers: True Crime (Hardcover ed.). Time-Life. ISBN 978-0-7835-0001-0.
- Hunter, Brad (2022). Inside the Mind of John Wayne Gacy: The Real-Life Killer Clown. Ad Lib Publishers. ISBN 978-1-802-47076-5.
- Nelson, David (2021). Boys Enter the House: The Victims of John Wayne Gacy and the Lives they Left Behind (Hardback ed.). Chicago Review Press. ISBN 978-1-641-60486-4.
- Sullivan, Terry; Maiken, Peter T. (2000). Killer Clown: The John Wayne Gacy Murders (Paperback ed.). Pinnacle. ISBN 0-7860-1422-9. OCLC 156783287.
- Whittington-Egan, Richard; Whittington-Egan, Molly (1992). The Murder Almanac. Glasgow: Neil Wilson Publishing. p. 70. ISBN 978-1-897-78404-4.
