= Omaha Jewish Community Center =

Coordinates: 41°15′24″N 96°07′01″W

The Jewish Community Center in Omaha, Nebraska was established in 1926, and moved to its present location at 333 South 132nd Street in 1973. The original JCC was the site of important labor organizing in the city, and has continued to serve as an important center for financial support in Omaha's Jewish community throughout its history. Today the JCC is the site of a Holocaust memorial that is unique in the Midwestern United States. In 2008 teams from the United States Olympic Trials practiced at the JCC before partaking in the official trials in downtown Omaha.

== History ==
When it originally opened in June 1926 at 20th and Dodge Streets in Downtown Omaha the JCC had a library, gymnasium, auditorium and Talmud Torah. The purpose of housing a wide variety of cultural, social, recreational, and other activities for the area's Jewish population. Jews from Germany, Poland, Russia and other Eastern European countries participated in a variety of Jewish cultural activities at the JCC; however, they did not celebrate their own national cultures, further attributing to cultural assimilation. In 1931 the JCC merged with the Omaha Welfare Federation and the Omaha Jewish Philanthropies, with the new name of The Jewish Community Center and Welfare Federation. The Jewish Community Forum featuring renowned guest speakers, the Jewish Youth Council dedicated to youth development and the Philanthropies Campaign, which has administered the collection of funds for numerous Jewish causes, were all located at the JCC.

The Center moved to West Omaha in 1973, influencing "a substantial amount of secondary real estate selections" as families and synagogues moved west.

== Activities ==
Today the organization continues its active program as "an institution which houses all forms of Jewish activity and which brings to its doors men, women, and children for the enrichment of their personality and for the growth of their Jewish life." The Omaha Jewish Community Center houses a number of programs and organizations, including the Jewish Federation of Omaha, the Kripke Jewish Federation Library, the Jewish Press, the Center for Jewish Education, the Dan and Esther Gordman Center for Jewish Learning, the Institute for Holocaust Education, and the ADL/CRC.

Facilities at the JCC include the Friedel Jewish Academy, theatre, art gallery space, dance and music studios, meeting rooms and classrooms, the Rose Blumkin Jewish Home, the Herbert Goldsten Synagogue and Livingston Plaza Apartments. There is an indoor pool and outdoor aquatic center, baseball, soccer, basketball, and handball facilities, two indoor running tracks, men's and women's health clubs, and a health and fitness center.

== Nebraska Jewish Historical Society ==
The Nebraska Jewish Historical Society is located at the Omaha Jewish Community Center. Permanent exhibits include “Jewish Landmarks,” “Our Story” and “From Generation to Generation”, and there are changing exhibits in the main gallery. The Society also features archives of local Jewish history. The Henry and Dorothy Riekes Museum features a representation of a neighborhood shul.

== See also ==
- Jews and Judaism in Omaha, Nebraska
