= Shchadryn =

Agrotown in Gomel Region, Belarus

Shchadryn Шчадрын (Belarusian) Щедрин (Russian) Shchedrin
- Agrotown
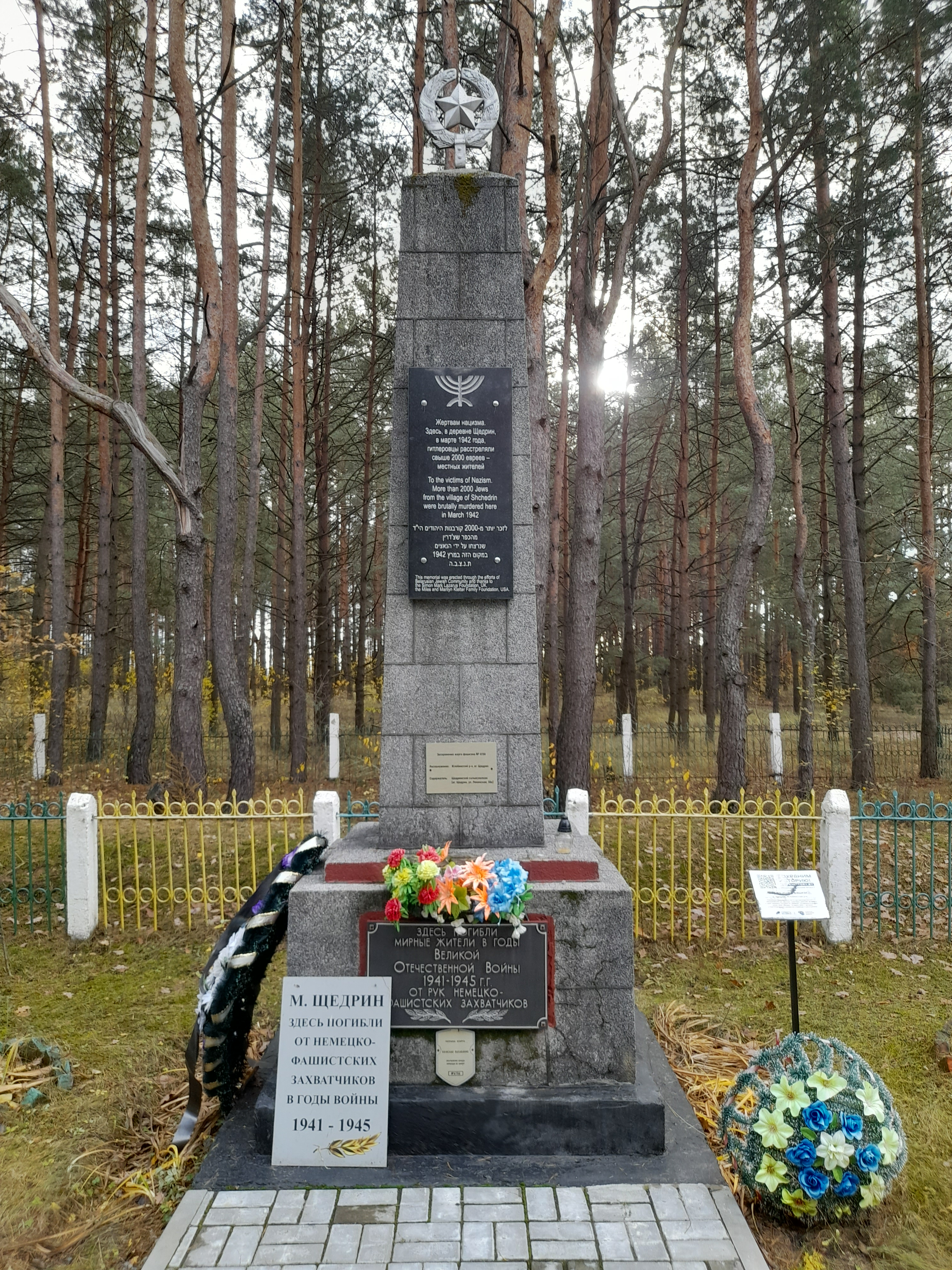
- Monument to the Jewish victims of the Holocaust in Shchedrin

- Location within Belarus
- Coordinates: 52°49′54″N 29°33′02″E
- Country: Belarus
- Region: Gomel Region
- District: Zhlobin District
- Founded: 1846

Population (1926)
  - Total: 1,759

Shchadryn or Shchedrin (Belarusian: Шчадрын, romanized: Ščadryn; Russian: Щедрин; Yiddish: שצעדרין) is an agrotown in Zhlobin District, Gomel Region, Belarus. It serves as the administrative center of Shchadryn selsoviet.

Before the Holocaust, the settlement functioned as a shtetl and was home to members of the Chabad-Lubavitch sect of Hasidic Judaism.

== History ==
According to Chabad sources, the village of Shchedrin was established in 1846 by Rabbi Menachem Mendel Schneersohn. Schneersohn purchased an estate of 17.5 square kilometers. The beginnings of the settlement involved sixty Jewish families who resided on the land. Schneersohn reportedly provided the families with building materials and other necessary equipment for developing the area. A considerable part of the land in the area belonged to timber dealer Chaim Golodetz, a Chabad Hasid, who helped establish the village after receiving land from Schneersohn.

By 1897, the population of the village had grown to 4,000, with Jews totalling the village's vast majority. Following a decline in the local timber trade and the subsequent departure of the Golodetz family, many residents began to emigrate from the town. In 1909, Rabbi Shalom Dovber Schneersohn organised for a branch of the Tomchei Tmimim yeshiva to be founded in the village. By 1926, there were 1,759 Jews living in the village.

=== During the Holocaust ===
In July 1941, the German Army occupied the village and quickly appointed local non-Jews to serve in administrative positions and to act as a police force. In August 1941, the Germans and the local police forced the Jewish population into a ghetto and had begun forcing Jews to perform forced labor. Individual Jews were killed during this time in various settings. The following year, in March 1942, the German Army and the local police systematically rounded up the majority of the Jewish residents and murdered them in a mass grave. In June 1944, the Soviet Army recaptured the village and the Soviet Extraordinary State Commission investigated the mass grave.

== Notable people ==
- Rose Blumkin (1893–1998), businesswoman
