= Temple Israel Cemetery (Omaha, Nebraska) =

Temple Israel Cemetery Pleasant Hill Cemetery
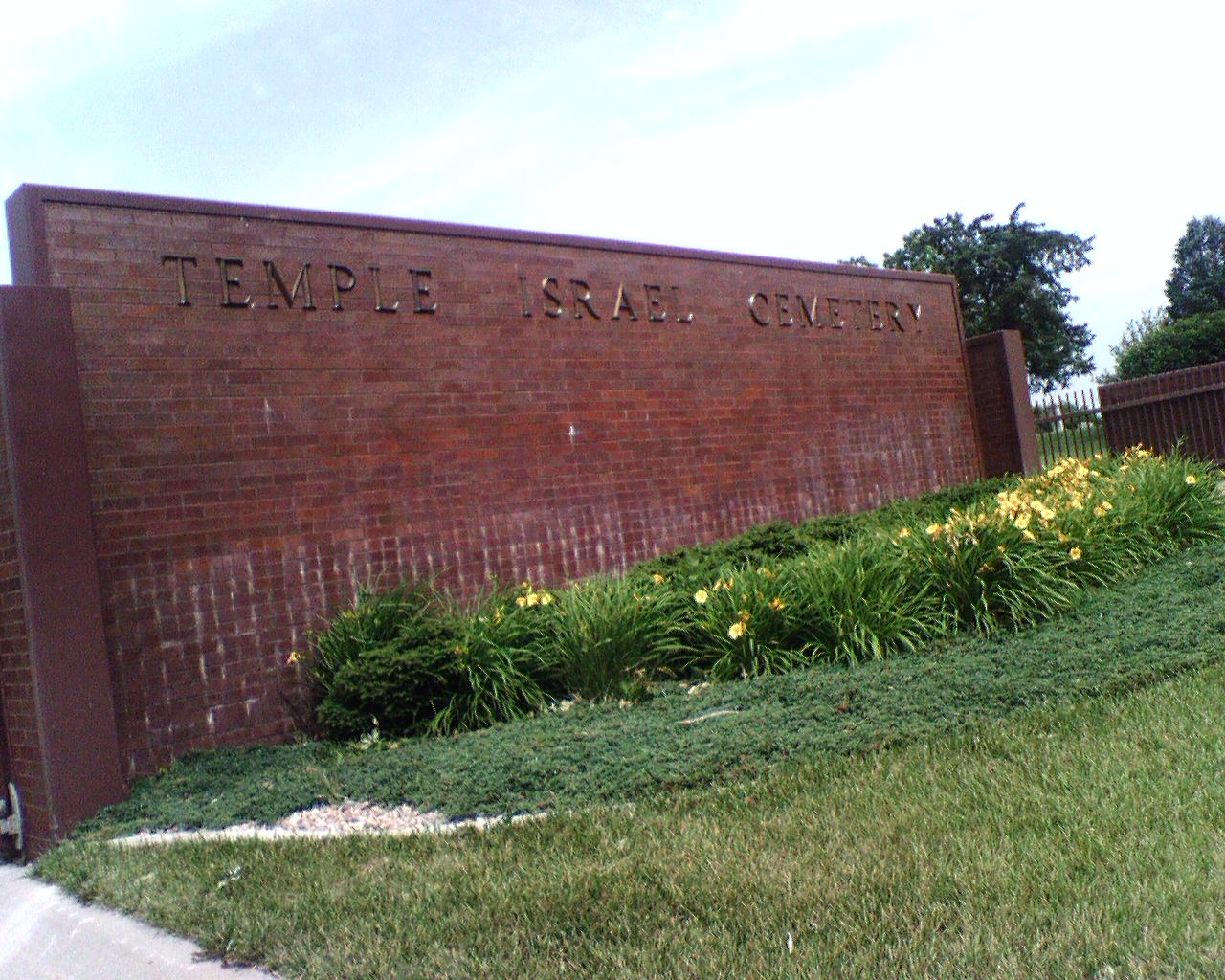
- Sign at entrance
- Interactive map of Temple Israel Cemetery; Pleasant Hill Cemetery

Details
- Location: Omaha, Nebraska
- Country: United States
- Coordinates: 41°19′02″N 95°58′36″W
- Type: Jewish
- Owned by: Temple Israel
- Size: five
- Find a Grave: Temple Israel Cemetery; Pleasant Hill Cemetery
- The Political Graveyard: Temple Israel Cemetery; Pleasant Hill Cemetery

Temple Israel Cemetery, also known as Pleasant Hill Cemetery, is located at 6412 North 42 Street (42nd and Redick Avenue) in the North Omaha neighborhood of Omaha, Nebraska.

== History ==
The cemetery comprises cemeteries for three congregations: Temple Israel Synagogue and two defunct synagogues, B'nai Jacob and Anshe Sholom.

Temple Israel Cemetery is the oldest Jewish cemetery in Nebraska. Five acres of land was purchased by the B’nai Israel Society in August 1871. The Society deeded the cemetery to the Congregation of Israel, which later became Temple Israel.

The cemetery is part of the Conservative and Reform Jewish communities of Omaha. It is a medium-sized cemetery that is situated on five acres and features a long central drive that goes down a steep hill. The cemetery, along with a new front gate, was refurbished in 1999.

== Notable burials ==
- Emil Brandeis, son of Jonas L. Brandeis, founder of Brandeis, who died on the Titanic – only his ashes are buried here
- Jonas L. Brandeis, who founded Brandeis, the landmark Omaha department store
- Lester Simon, from the Omaha Steaks family, who was instrumental in expanding the business into mail order via the Union Pacific Railroad
- The cemetery also has graves for Jewish soldiers and officers from Omaha who were killed in World War I, World War II, and other wars

== See also ==
- History of the Jews in Omaha, Nebraska
- List of cemeteries in Omaha
- History of Omaha
- Jewish cemeteries
