= Laurel Hill Plantation =

Laurel Hill Plantation may refer to:

- Laurel Hill Plantation (South Carolina), a plantation in Beaufort County, South Carolina
- Laurel Hill Plantation (Adams County, Mississippi)
- Laurel Hill Plantation (Jefferson County, Mississippi)

== See also ==
- Laurel Hill (disambiguation)
