= Myer S. Kripke =

American rabbi, scholar, and philanthropist

Rabbi Myer S. Kripke

Personal life
- Born: Myer Samuel Kripke; January 21, 1914 Toledo, Ohio, US
- Died: April 11, 2014 (aged 100) Omaha, Nebraska, US
- Buried: Beth El Cemetery
- Spouse: Dorothy K. Kripke
- Children: Saul A. Kripke; Madeline F. Kripke; Netta Stern
- Parent(s): J. Michael Kripke; Nettie Kripke
- Education: New York University; Columbia University; Jewish Theological Seminary of America
- Occupation: Rabbi; Scholar; Philanthropist

Religious life
- Religion: Judaism
- Denomination: Conservative Judaism
- Synagogue: Beth El Synagogue; Omaha, Nebraska
- Yeshiva: Jewish Theological Seminary of America
- Began: 1937
- Ended: 1976

Myer Samuel Kripke (January 21, 1914 – April 11, 2014) was an American rabbi, scholar, and philanthropist. He was based in Omaha, Nebraska.

== Early life ==
Kripke was born on January 21, 1914 in Toledo, Ohio, to parents Jacob "J. Michael" Kripke and Nettie Kripke (née Goldman). Kripke was one of seven children: Harold, Sidney, Albert, Homer, Shirley, and Joseph. His father bought and sold containers (bottles, barrels). Kripke's parents were from Poland. In the 1860s, his family settled in Cleveland, Ohio.

== Career ==
In 1930 Kripke moved to New York to study at New York University and the Jewish Theological Seminary of America. He graduated from New York University Phi Beta Kappa and earned a master's degree in philosophy from Columbia University. He received his master's, doctoral, and rabbinical degrees from the Jewish Theological Seminary of America in New York City. He was senior class president at the seminary in 1937.

Kripke was a rabbi at synagogues in Racine, Wisconsin, Patchogue, New York on Long Island, and New London, Connecticut.

In 1946, Kripke became the Rabbi at the Conservative Jewish Beth El synagogue in Omaha, Nebraska. He held this position from 1946 to 1975. In 1975, he was named rabbi emeritus at Beth El. From 1976–90, Kripke was an adjunct Associate Professor of Theology at Creighton University, regularly teaching courses in Judaism and Hebrew Bible. He toured various cities as a lecturer and speaker. Starting in 1980, Kripke wrote a commentary on the weekly Torah portion for the Omaha Jewish Press.

=== Awards ===
- In 2000 Creighton University awarded him the degree Doctor of Humane Letters, honoris causa.
- In 2007 Kripke received the Otto Swanson Spirit of Service Award from the Conference for Inclusive Communities.

== Philanthropy ==
The Kripkes were active in philanthropy, which originated with their decision to invest with Warren Buffett. They got to know him and his wife Susan at the Beth El Synagogue. The couples had a lifelong friendship. Buffett and Kripke's wives, the latter a published author, had common interests in education and community service. Kripke's wife encouraged him to approach Buffett in hopes of helping them with their investments. As early investors with Buffett, the Kripkes benefitted greatly: their original investment of $70,000 increased to almost $25 million. They donated much of their profits to philanthropic causes.

=== Kripke Tower ===
The renovation of the Kripke Tower at Jewish Theological Seminary of America was funded in large part by a $7 million endowment by the Kripkes. The Kripkes' close ties to the seminary originated from them having met and married there.

=== Kripke Center ===
The Kripke Center at Creighton University was created to empower those among the faith communities to have better understanding of each other's differences and similarities.

=== National Jewish Book Award ===
Kripke endowed the Kripke National Jewish Book Award for Education and Jewish Identity in memory of his wife Dorothy, who died in 2000.

=== Reconstructionist Rabbinical College ===
Kripke and his wife gave nearly $1 million to the Reconstructionist Rabbinical College in Wyncote, Pennsylvania. The money created the Dorothy and Myer Kripke Scholarship Fund, which distributes $60,000 annually in scholarships and fellowships.

== Personal life and death ==
Kripke met his wife, Dorothy Karp, at the Jewish Theological Seminary of America, while both were students there. They married in 1937. Kripke and his wife had three children: Saul A. Kripke, a prominent philosopher and logician; Madeline Kripke, a bookseller, editor and authority on dictionaries and slang; and Netta Stern, who was a social worker and psychotherapist.

Kripke died at the age of 100 in Omaha, Nebraska. He was buried at Beth El Cemetery.

== Works or publications ==
- Kripke, Myer S. Cultural and Scientific Approaches to Jewish Ideas of God, Being Especially a Critique of the Theology of Mordecai M. Kaplan. Masters essay. Columbia University. Philosophy. 1937.
- Kripke, Dorothy K, Myer S. Kripke, and Laszlo Matulay. Let's Talk About Loving: About Love, Sex, Marriage, and Family. New York: Ktav Pub. House, 1980. ISBN 978-0-870-68913-0
- Kripke, Myer S. Insight and Interpretation: Reflections on the Weekly Sidrah. Chestnut Ridge, N.Y: Town House Press, 1988. ISBN 978-0-940-65315-3

== See also ==
- Jews in Omaha, Nebraska
