= Westlawn-Hillcrest Funeral Home and Memorial Park =

Funeral services in Douglas County, Nebraska

Coordinates: 41°14′06″N 95°59′56″W

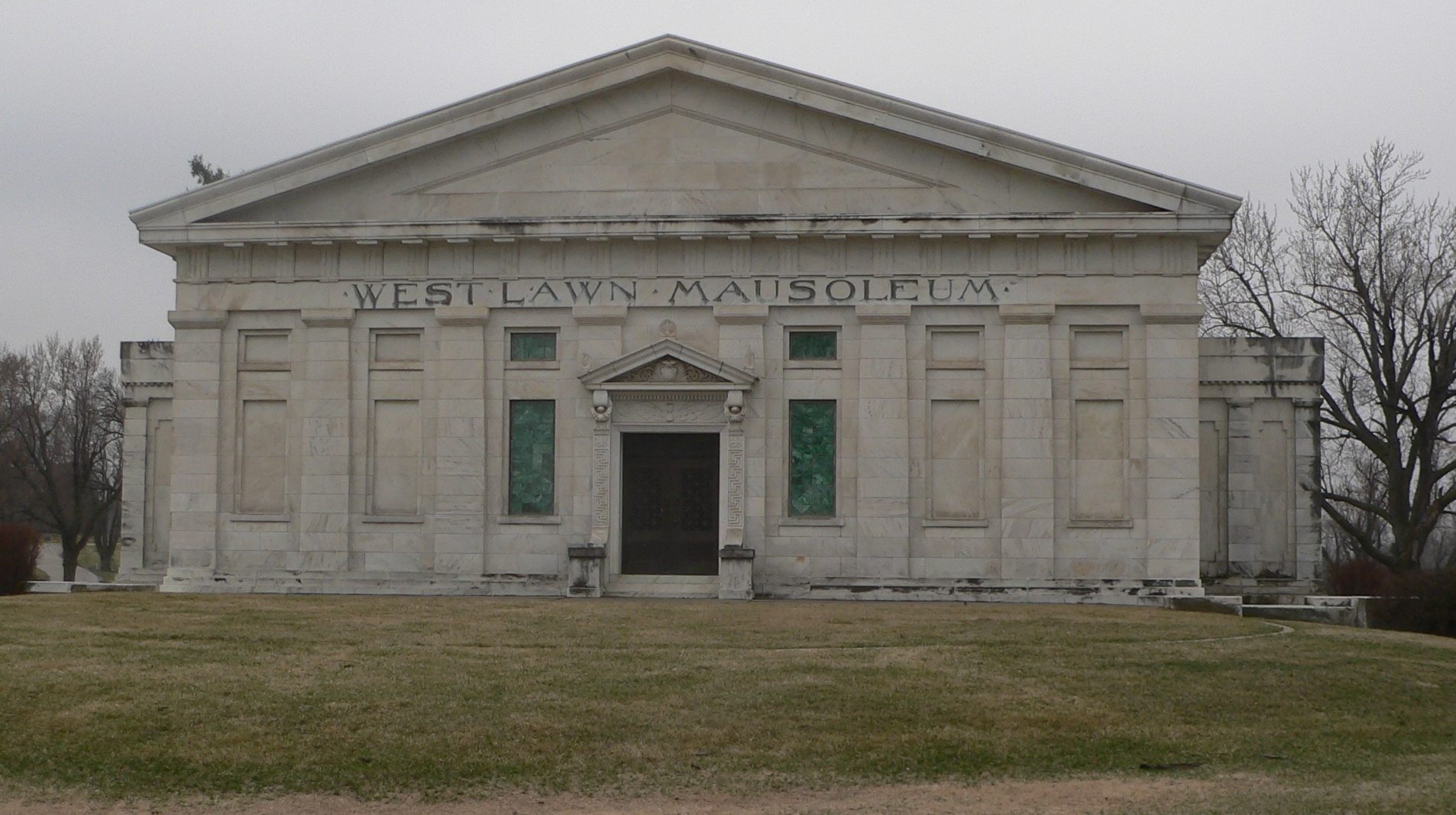
- Westlawn Mausoleum
- Interactive map of Westlawn-Hillcrest Funeral Home and Memorial Park

Details
- Location: 5701 Center Street, Omaha, Nebraska

Westlawn-Hillcrest Funeral Home and Memorial Park is a funeral home, cemetery and crematory located at 5701 Center Street in Omaha, Nebraska.

== About ==
Westlawn-Hillcrest consists of two cemeteries, the older Westlawn cemetery contains many upright stones, while the newer Hillcrest is a garden plan cemetery where only flat stones are allowed. The N. P. Dodge Co. was the original owner of Westlawn Cemetery. The first burials in Westlawn Cemetery occurred in 1910.

The Westlawn Mausoleum was designed by New York architect Henry Bacon, designer of the Lincoln Memorial in Washington, D.C. The structure, costing in excess of $460,000, was built between 1913 and 1915. The Classic Revival and Greco-Roman Temple mausoleum was officially dedicated on September 12, 1915. The structure is made from the same Colorado-Yule marble as the Lincoln Memorial.

In the center of the Hillcrest portion of the cemetery, above the Memorial Lawn section, is the Singing Tower. The Art Deco Singing Tower was built in 1931, and was modeled after the famous Bok Tower in Lake Wales, Florida. The Tower plays music daily from 8:00 a.m. to 6:00 p.m.

A funeral home located within the cemetery perimeter opened in 1998. Cremations are also performed onsite.

== Notable burials ==
- Jim Hartung (1960–2026), gymnastics
- Timothy McCoy (1955–1972), murder victim

== See also ==
- List of cemeteries in Omaha
