= List of cemeteries in Omaha =

The following is a list of cemeteries in Omaha, Douglas County, Nebraska in the United States.

The earliest cemetery in Omaha is the Mormon Pioneer Cemetery, established in 1846 for residents of Culter's Park.

== Cemeteries ==
Cemeteries in Omaha
Name	Established	Location	Affiliation	Size
Beth El Synagogue Cemetery	1939	4700 South 84th Street (84th & "L"), Ralston	Jewish	3 acres
Beth Hamedrosh Hagodol Cemetery	1901	8600 South 42 Street, Bellevue	Jewish	
Bird-Ritchie Cemetery		Just west of North 60th Street and half a mile south of Northern Hills Drive	Family	
Bohemian National Cemetery	1883	5201 Center Street	Bohemian	40 acres
Calvary Cemetery		7710 West Center Road	Catholic	
Elk City Cemetery			Public	
Evergreen Memorial Park Cemetery		2300 South 78 Street	Public	
Fisher Farm Cemetery	1901	8600 South 42 Street, Bellevue	Jewish	
Flower Hill Cemetery, a.k.a. German Lutheran		North 144 Street, between Fort and Ida Streets	Lutheran	
Forest Lawn Memorial Park	1885	7909 Mormon Bridge Road	Private	
Golden Hill Cemetery	1888	5109 North 42 Street, North Omaha	Jewish	
Graceland Park Cemetery		4723 South 42nd Street	Private	
Holy Sepulchre Cemetery		4912 Leavenworth Street	Catholic	
Hrabik Cemetery		8600 South 42 Street, Bellevue	Jewish	
Laurel Hill Cemetery, a.k.a. Sautter's Cemetery, German Cemetery	1866	21st & Polk Streets		
Mormon Pioneer Cemetery	1846	3301 State Street	Mormon	
Mount Auburn Cemetery		Elkhorn		
Mount Calvary Cemetery		Skyline & CR 78		
Mount Hope Cemetery		7602 Military Avenue	Public	
Mount Sinai Cemetery		North 78 Street & Crown Point Avenue	Jewish	
Old Elkhorn Cemetery a.k.a. Old Britton, Spring Grove		SW of US 275 & S. 222nd		
Pleasant Hill Cemetery at Millard		Pacific & S. 132nd	Public	
Poor Farm				
Potter's Field Cemetery	1887	5000 Young Street	Public	
Prospect Hill Cemetery	1856	3202 Parker Street	Public	
Prospect Hill Cemetery at Elkhorn		0.2 m. W of CR 80 on W. Maple Road/SH 64	Public	
Resurrection Cemetery		7710 West Center Road	Catholic	
Saint John's Cemetery		7506 S 36th Street, Bellevue	Catholic	
Saint Mary Cemetery		3353 Q Street	Catholic	
Saint Mary Magdalene Cemetery		5226 South 46 Street	Catholic	
Springwell Danish Cemetery	1889	6326 Hartman Avenue	Danish	
Temple Israel Cemetery	1871	6412 North 42 Street (42nd & Redick), North Omaha	Jewish	5 acres
Union Cemetery, a.k.a. Noyce Cemetery, Thomas Cemetery			Private	
Valley Cemetery, a.k.a. Mercer Cemetery		Near CR 15 & CR 106	Public	
Westlawn-Hillcrest Cemetery		5701 Center Street	Private	

== See also ==
- History of Omaha
- Jews and Judaism in Omaha
- Christians and Christianity in Omaha
