= Tim Cahill (writer) =

American writer

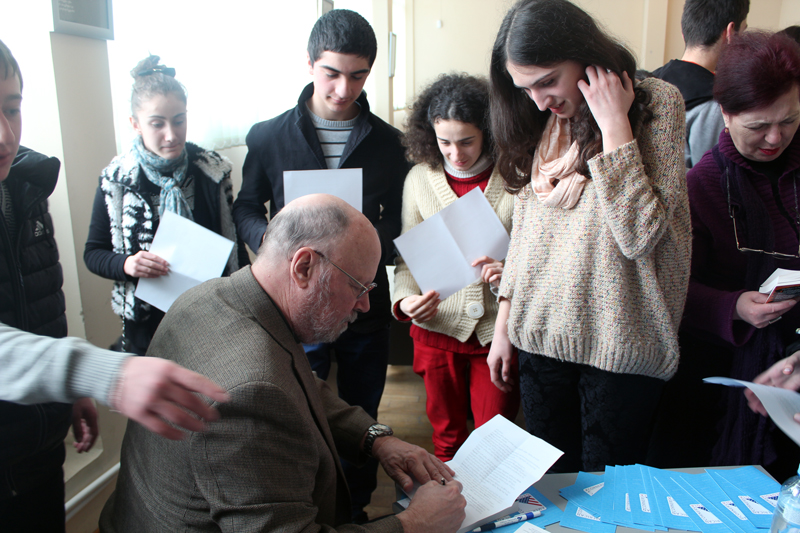
- Tim Cahill signs autographs for young readers in Georgia in 2014.
- Born: 1943 (age 82–83); Nashville, Tennessee, USA
- Education: B.A. in European intellectual history from Wisconsin; M.A. in creative writing from SF State (1970)
- Occupation: Adventure travel writer
- Spouse: Linnea Larson (deceased)
- Writing career
- Genre: Travel writing

Tim Cahill (born 1944 in Nashville, Tennessee) is a travel writer who lives in Livingston, Montana, United States. He is a founding editor of Outside magazine and currently serves as an editor at large for the magazine.

== Biography ==
Cahill spent his childhood primarily in Waukesha, Wisconsin. He attended the University of Wisconsin–Madison on a swimming scholarship. Along with professional long-distance driver Garry Sowerby, Cahill set a world record for speed in driving the entire length of the American continents, from Ushuaia in Tierra del Fuego in southern Argentina up along the Pan-American Highway to Prudhoe Bay, Alaska in twenty-three days, twenty-two hours, and forty-three minutes. This trip was the source material for his 1991 book Road Fever. He has written several books recounting his adventure travel experiences and blends his own brand of humor into his stories. He is a frequent contributor to National Geographic Adventure magazine. His 1986 book Buried Dreams: Inside the Mind of a Serial Killer was instrumental in the identification of Timothy McCoy as the first known victim of serial killer John Wayne Gacy.

Cahill lost his wife, Linnea Larson, to a traffic accident in April 2008.

== Bibliography ==
- Buried Dreams : Inside the Mind of a Serial Killer, Bantam Books: 1986. ISBN 0-553-05115-6
- Jaguars Ripped My Flesh: Adventure is a Risky Business, Bantam Books: 1987. ISBN 0-553-34276-2
- A Wolverine Is Eating My Leg, Vintage Books: 1989. ISBN 0-679-72026-X
- Road Fever: A High-Speed Travelogue, Random House: 1991. ISBN 0-394-57656-X
- Pecked To Death By Ducks, Random House: 1993. ISBN 0-679-40735-9
- Pass The Butterworms: Remote Journeys Oddly Rendered, Villard: 1997. ISBN 0-679-45625-2
- Dolphins (book), National Geographic: 2000. ISBN 0-7922-7594-2
- Hold The Enlightenment, Villard: 2002. ISBN 0-375-50766-3
- Lost in my own Backyard : a Walk in Yellowstone National Park, Crown Journeys: 2004. ISBN 1-4000-4622-X
- Not So Funny When It Happened : the Best of Travel Humor and Misadventure (editor), Travelers' Tales: 2000. ISBN 1-885211-55-4
