= Dorothy K. Kripke =

American author (1912–2000)

Dorothy Kripke

Personal life
- Born: Dorothy Karp; February 6, 1912 New York City, New York, U.S.
- Died: September 6, 2000 (aged 88) Omaha, Nebraska, U.S.
- Buried: Beth El Cemetery
- Spouse: Myer S. Kripke
- Children: Saul A. Kripke; Madeline F. Kripke; Netta Stern
- Parent(s): Max Karp; Goldie Karp
- Occupation: Author

Religious life
- Religion: Judaism

Jewish leader
- Synagogue: Beth El Synagogue

Dorothy Karp Kripke (February 6, 1912 – September 6, 2000) was an American author of Jewish educational books.

== Early life ==
Kripke, born Dorothy Karp on February 6, 1912 in New York City, was the daughter of Max Samuel Karp, a rabbi, and Goldie Karp (née Mereminsky).

In 1937 she married Myer S. Kripke at the Jewish Theological Seminary in New York City. They had three children, Saul, Madeline, and Netta.

Kripke died on September 6, 2000, in Omaha, after a long illness.

== Career ==
Kripke was a Jewish Theological Seminary graduate, Rebbetzin (Rabbanit) and children's book author, and is the mother of noted philosopher Saul A. Kripke. Some of her books were illustrated by Vladimir Bobri.

== Philanthropy ==
The Kripkes made the decision to become active in philanthropy after a series of successful investments left them in a position where they were able to donate large sums to worthwhile causes.

== Works or publications ==
- Kripke, Dorothy K, and Aimee Neibart. Let's Talk About Being Jewish. New York: Ktav, 1952 [1981].
- Kripke, Dorothy K, and Jessie B. Robinson. Rhymes to Pray. New York: Bloch Pub. Co, 1952.
- Kripke, Dorothy K, and Vladimir Bobri. Let's Talk About God. New York: Behrman House, 1953.
- Kripke, Dorothy K, and Christine Tripp. Let's Talk About God. Los Angeles, CA: Alef Design Group, 2003. ISBN 978-1-881-28334-8 (2003 reprint of 1953 book with illustrations by Christine Tripp)
- Kripke, Dorothy K. Let's Talk About Right and Wrong. New York: Behrman House, 1955.
- Kripke, Dorothy K. Let's Talk About Judaism. New York: Behrman House, 1957.
- Kripke, Dorothy K. Debbie in Dreamland: Her Holiday Adventures. New York: National Women's league of the United Synagogue of America, 1960.
- Kripke, Dorothy K, Meyer Levin, Stephen Kraft, and Lorence F. Bjorkland. God and the Story of Judaism. New York: Behrman House, 1962.
- Kripke, Dorothy K. Let's Talk About the Jewish Holidays. New York: Jonathan David, 1970.
- Kripke, Dorothy K, Myer S. Kripke, and Laszlo Matulay. Let's Talk About Loving: About Love, Sex, Marriage, and Family. New York: Ktav Pub. House, 1980. ISBN 978-0-870-68913-0
- Kripke, Dorothy K, Stacy Crossland, and Joy N. Wieder. Let's Talk About the Sabbath. Los Angeles, Calif: Alef Design Group, 1999. ISBN 978-1-881-28318-8
- Kripke, Dorothy K. Children's Books and Stories About American Jewish Life and History: A Bibliography. New York: American Jewish Historical Society.

== See also ==
- Myer S. Kripke
- Saul A. Kripke
- Jews in Omaha, Nebraska
