= Laurel Hill =

Laurel Hill may refer to:

== Places ==
- Laurel Hill, New South Wales, Australia, a town in the Riverina region
- Laurel Hill Coláiste, a school in Limerick, Ireland

=== United States ===
- Laurel Hill, Florida, a city in Okaloosa County
- Laurel Hill, Scotland County, North Carolina, an unincorporated community
- Laurel Hill, Lincoln County, North Carolina, an unincorporated community
- Laurel Hill (Oregon), a historic hill on the Oregon Trail
- Laurel Hill (Pennsylvania), also known as Laurel Ridge, located in the Allegheny Mountains
- Laurel Hill, Virginia, a census-designated place in Fairfax County
- Laurel Hill Cemetery (disambiguation)
- Laurel Hill Creek, a tributary of the Youghiogheny River in Pennsylvania
- Laurel Hill Mansion, an historic mansion in east Fairmount Park, Philadelphia, Pennsylvania
- Laurel Hill Plantation (disambiguation)
- Laurel Hill Farm, a private park and historic home in Ararat, Virginia

== Other uses ==
- Snake Hill, also known as Laurel Hill, an igneous rock intrusion in New Jersey
- Laurel Mountain (West Virginia), also known as Laurel Hill, site of the Battle of Laurel Hill
