= Rose Blumkin =

American businesswoman (1893–1998)

- Blumkin in 1977
- Born: Rose Gorelick; December 3, 1893; Shchadryn, Russian Empire
- Died: August 9, 1998 (aged 104); Omaha, Nebraska, US
- Occupation: Businesswoman

Rose Blumkin (née Gorelick; December 3, 1893 – August 9, 1998) was a Belarusian-born American businesswoman. In 1937, she founded the Nebraska Furniture Mart.

== Early life ==
Blumkin was born on December 3, 1893 as Rosa Gorelick to a Jewish family in Shchedrin, a village near Babruysk in present day Belarus. She was one of eight children of Solomon and Chasya Gorelick. Her father was a rabbi and her mother ran a grocery store. When she was twenty, Rose married Izya (Isadore) Blumkin.

Blumkin immigrated to the United States in 1917. She arrived in Seattle unable to communicate in English and was transferred by the American Red Cross to Fort Dodge, Iowa, where her husband was living. Two years later, in 1919, the couple moved to Omaha, Nebraska, the nearest city with a community of Russian and Yiddish speakers, where they started a used clothing store.

== Career ==
Blumkin opened the Nebraska Furniture Mart in 1933, selling used furniture. Known as "Mrs. B.", she was in her mid-40s when she opened the business in the basement of her husband's store with an investment of US$500 (approximately $12,000 in 2025).

Blumkin grew the business to become the largest indoor furniture store in America. This caught the attention of Warren Buffett. In 1983, Buffett's company purchased a 90% share of the Nebraska Furniture Mart for $60 million (approximately $194 million in 2025).

In 1989, six years after selling 90% of her company to Berkshire Hathaway, Blumkin retired, only to come out of retirement in three months to open up a rival store. It was called "Mrs. B's Clearance and Factory Outlet" and was situated directly across the street from the Furniture Mart. It became profitable by 1991. Buffett acquired the business in 1992.

== Later life and death ==
Blumkin was active as a philanthropist. The Rose Blumkin Performing Arts Center is named for her. She was also a large donor to the Omaha Jewish Community Center. She received honorary degrees from New York University and Creighton University. She died on August 9, 1998, aged 104, from heart disease and bronchitis. She is buried in the Golden Hill Jewish Cemetery.
