= Laurel Hill Cemetery, Omaha, Nebraska =

Cemetery in Omaha, Nebraska

Coordinates: 41°11′30″N 95°56′32″W

Laurel Hill Cemetery
- Interactive map of Laurel Hill Cemetery

Details
- Established: 1867
- Location: 21st Street, Omaha, Nebraska

Laurel Hill Cemetery is a burial ground located on 21st Street in Omaha, Nebraska, one block north of Harrison Street, which is the dividing line between Douglas County and Sarpy County in Nebraska.

== About ==
Laurel Hill Cemetery was originally a private cemetery on the farm of Christian and Elizabeth Sautter and was known as Sautter Cemetery. The earliest recorded burial on the property was Friedrich Sautter in January 1867. Around 1880 the cemetery appears to have been opened to the public, and in 1883 became locally known as Laurel Hill Cemetery. In 1886, W.G. Albright completed the purchase of the Christian Sautter farm and officially mapped out 12 and 1/2 acres of burial lots. At this time the cemetery's name was also officially changed to Laurel Hill Cemetery. Unofficially, the cemetery was also referred to as the German Cemetery in early obituaries.

In 1936 the cemetery was turned over to lot owners and an annual assessment for maintenance was levied. As families died out or moved away, the cemetery fell into disrepair. By 1967 the cemetery appeared overgrown and abandoned. It was at this time that Helen Zentz, who had family buried at the cemetery, stepped in to organize and lead the Laurel Hill Cemetery Association. Through the efforts of this volunteer organization, Laurel Hill Cemetery is once again an active, well-kept cemetery.

Notable burials in the cemetery are the maternal grandmother of Peter Kiewit, Anna Schleicher and her daughter, Rose, and Fred Astaire's maternal grandmother, Wilhelmine Geilus and her son, August.

The cemetery continues to be maintained by the non-profit Laurel Hill Cemetery Association.

== See also ==
- List of cemeteries in Omaha
