= Russ Ewing =

American broadcast journalist (1923–2019)

- Born: Russell H. Ewing; December 28, 1923; Chicago, Illinois, U.S.
- Died: June 25, 2019 (aged 95); Paw Paw, Michigan, U.S.
- Occupations: journalist, television personality, crisis negotiator
- Years active: 1969–1995
- Spouse: Ruth Ewing

Russell H. Ewing (December 28, 1923 – June 25, 2019) was an American broadcast journalist in Chicago from 1967 to the late 1990s. Working for WLS-TV (ABC affiliate) and WMAQ-TV (NBC affiliate), he established a reputation as an investigative journalist, and became known as a go-between who negotiated more than 115 surrenders to police of wanted felons, often wanted for murder.

== Early life ==
Russ Ewing was born in Chicago. At the age of seven he was orphaned, first taken in by an aunt, and later adopted by a neighboring family. Following attendance at Englewood High School, he became a firefighter in Chicago. In the 1960s he began work as a film courier for WMAQ, and first appeared on-camera in 1967.

== Career ==
In the 1970s Ewing won awards for investigative reporting on abuses at Chicago's animal shelter and on discriminatory lending practices by Chicago-area banks. In 1974 he won an Emmy Award for his reports on conditions at the Cook County Jail, where he had posed as an inmate for two days. Ewing won eight more Emmys in his career.

In 1975 Ewing convinced a murder suspect to surrender to police, and the following year Ewing and publisher Gus Savage negotiated the surrender of two robbers who had taken hostages. Following his move to WLS, he continued to arrange for surrenders, eventually reaching as many as 115 surrenders.

Ewing aired the first interview with serial killer John Wayne Gacy in 1980 following Gacy's conviction, and in 1986 established the identity of a previously unidentified victim of Gacy's. Working with dental records, Ewing identified victim Timothy McCoy.

Ewing retired from WLS in 1995, briefly returning in 1998 to WMAQ as a special correspondent. An accomplished pianist, he formed the Russ Ewing Trio in 1981. Following a childhood interest in aviation, he obtained a private pilot's license and occasionally used his personal airplane in surrenders.

The podcast Criminal produced an episode about the life and career of Russ Ewing, "Call Russ Ewing."

== Death ==
He died from complications of bladder cancer on June 25, 2019, at the age of 95, at his home in Paw Paw, Michigan.

== See also ==
- Crisis negotiation
