= Beth Hamedrash Hagodol Synagogue (Hartford, Connecticut) =

Historic former synagogue in Hartford, Connecticut, US

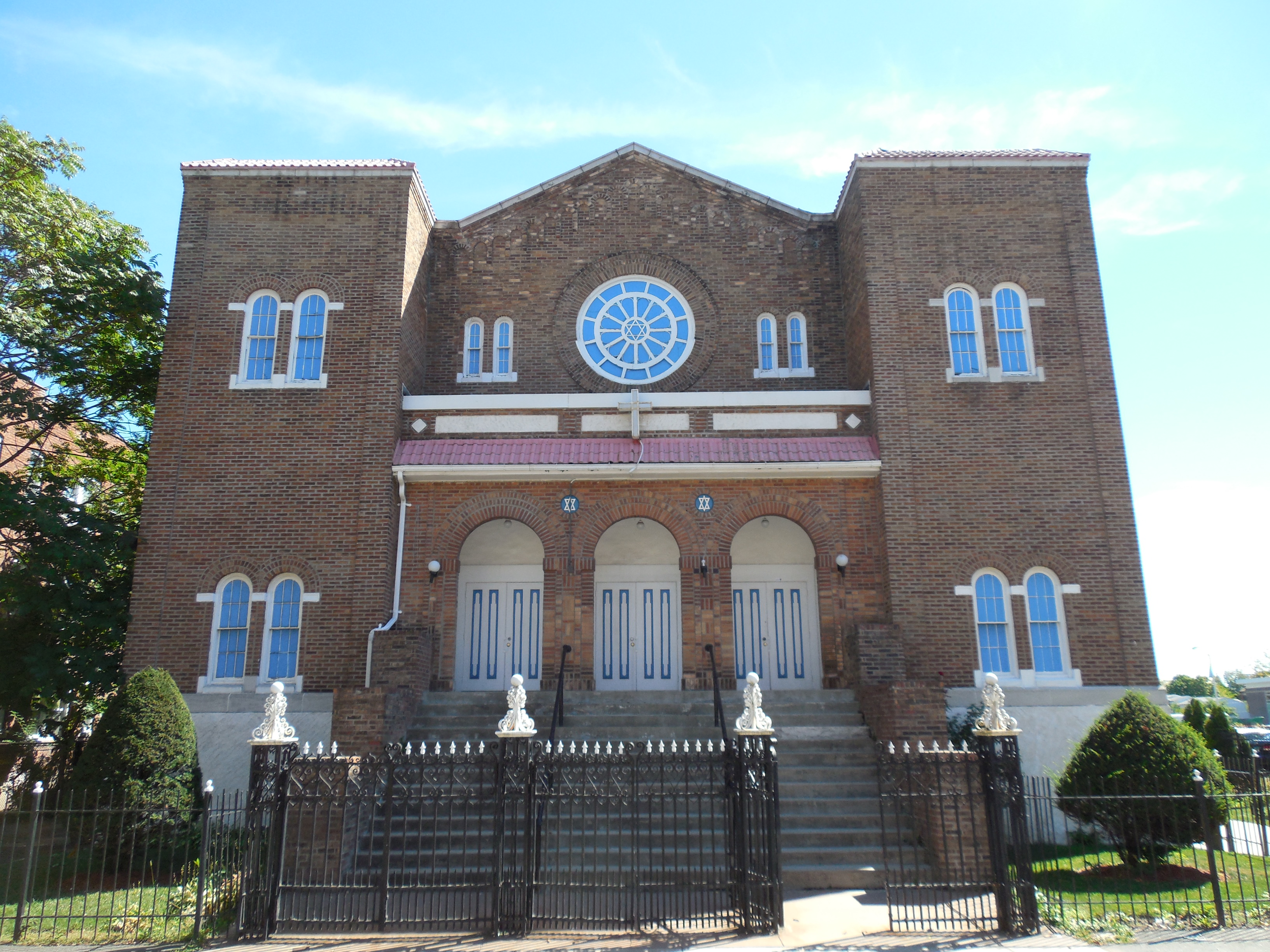
- The former synagogue, now church, in 2014

- Location of the former synagogue in Connecticut

Religion
- Affiliation: Orthodox Judaism (former); Christianity (current)
- Ecclesiastical or organizational status: Synagogue (1922–c. 1960s); Church (since c. 1980s)
- Ownership: Greater Refuge Church of Christ
- Status: Closed (as a synagogue); Repurposed (as a church)

Location
- Location: 370 Garden Street, Hartford, Connecticut
- Country: United States
- Interactive map of Beth Hamedrash Hagodol Synagogue
- Coordinates: 41°46′44″N 72°41′6″W

Architecture
- Architects: Berenson & Moses
- Type: Synagogue
- Style: Romanesque Revival
- Established: 1905 (as a congregation)
- Completed: 1922

Website
- greaterrefugect.org
- Beth Hamedrash Hagodol Synagogue
- U.S. National Register of Historic Places
- Area: less than one acre
- MPS: Historic Synagogues of Connecticut MPS
- NRHP reference No.: 95000577
- Added to NRHP: May 11, 1995

Beth Hamedrash Hagodol Synagogue is an historic former Orthodox Jewish congregation and synagogue, located at 370 Garden Street, Hartford, Connecticut, in the United States.

Founded in 1905, the congregation built the Romanesque Revival temple on Garden Street in 1921–22. The congregation merged with the Ateres Kneset Israel congregation in 1962 to form the United Synagogue of Greater Hartford, and moved to new quarters in West Hartford.

The congregation's building was vacated and during the 1980s converted into a Christian church, called the Greater Refuge Church of Christ. This former synagogue, now church, was added to the National Register of Historic Places in 1995 as part of a multiple property listing of fifteen historic synagogues in Connecticut.

== Architecture and history ==
The former Beth Hamedrash Hagodol building is located in Hartford's Clay-Arsenal neighborhood, on the east side of Garden Street north of Albany Avenue (United States Route 44). It is a brick building, two stories in height, with Romanesque styling. Its front facade has slightly projecting square corner towers, with paired narrow round-arch windows on each level. Stairs rise in between the towers to three entrances, each set in a rounded arch. On the second level above the entrances is a central circular window with Star of David tracery at its center, with flanking paired round-arch windows.

The congregation was established in 1905 on Hartford's East Side, originally meeting in a space on Wooster Street. In 1921 it merged with Sharah Torah, another Orthodox congregation, and the combination built this synagogue in 1922 to be nearer the homes of its congregants. The building was designed by Julius Berenson and Jacob Moses, Jewish architects active in Hartford. It was the first of two synagogues they are known to have designed; the other was located on Greenfield Street. The congregation was again merged with other Orthodox congregations in the 1960s, which established the United Synagogue of Greater Hartford in West Hartford.

The former Beth Hamedrash Hagodol synagogue building was one of fifteen Connecticut synagogues added to the National Register of Historic Places in 1995 and 1996 in response to an unprecedented multiple submission, nominating nineteen synagogues.

This building is now owned by the Greater Refuge Church of Christ.

== See also ==
- National Register of Historic Places listings in Hartford, Connecticut
