= Madeline Kripke =

American collector of dictionaries (1943–2020)

- Born: September 9, 1943; New London, Connecticut, U.S.
- Died: April 25, 2020 (aged 76); Manhattan, New York, U.S.
- Education: Barnard College (B.A.)
- Known for: Collecting dictionaries
- Parent(s): Myer S. Kripke (father); Dorothy Karp Kripke (mother)
- Relatives: Saul Kripke (brother); Netta Kripke Stern (sister)

Madeline Faith Kripke (September 9, 1943 – April 25, 2020) was an American book collector who held one of the world's largest collections of dictionaries.

== Early life and education ==
Madeline Kripke was born on September 9, 1943, in New London, Connecticut, to mother Dorothy Karp Kripke and father Myer S. Kripke, a rabbi. Kripke's brother was philosopher Saul Kripke, and her sister was Netta Kripke Stern, a social worker. She graduated with a bachelor's degree in English from Barnard College.

== Dictionary collection and career ==
In fifth grade, she recalled receiving a Webster's Collegiate Dictionary from her parents, which she said "unlocked the world for me". Kripke acquired a collection of approximately 20,000 dictionaries in her two-bedroom apartment. The oldest dictionary in her collection was a Latin dictionary published in 1502 by Ambrogio Calepino. She placed a special emphasis on collecting dictionaries regarding obscure slang. Her collection includes the only known copy of Larks of London (1840), a dictionary of slang from the London underworld. Simon Winchester said that her collection of slang dictionaries represented "the very living and breathing edge of the English language". Jesse Sheidlower described her collection as better than that of the Library of Congress.

After graduating from college, Kripke held several jobs, including as a welfare case worker and a teacher. She eventually became an editor and a publisher, doing copyediting and proofreading. She also worked at several bookstores, eventually becoming a book dealer. By her later life, there was no need for her to work; her parents had been early investors with Warren Buffett and had made astonishing returns with Buffett's funds, turning a small investment of $67,000 into over $25 million. The elder Kripkes lived frugally and carefully nurtured their surprise fortune; once they died and the inheritance passed to their children, money was no obstacle for Madeline expanding her rare book collection. Rabbi and Mrs. Kripke donated over $15,000,000 of their wealth to the Jewish Theological Seminary. NY Times May 3, 2014

Kripke died without a will or a stated wish for what to do with her vast collection, resulting in her brother Saul Kripke becoming administrator of her estate. Saul convened various lexicographers who knew Madeline including Jesse Sheidlower, Ammon Shea, Jonathon Green, Tom Dalzell, and Michael Adams to decide what to do with it. While they received offers from elsewhere, Indiana University Bloomington offered to keep the entire collection intact and put it on display. This combined with their offered payment of $780,000 led the estate to pick it; her entire collection is now at the Lilly Library in Bloomington.

== Death ==
Kripke died from complications of COVID-19 in Manhattan during the COVID-19 pandemic in New York City on April 25, 2020.

== Awards and honors ==
Kripke was a founding member of the Dictionary Society of North America and attended every meeting for nearly forty years. In 2015 she was one of six Fellows elected to the Society, its highest honor, along with Anatoly Liberman and John Simpson. She received their Richard W. Bailey Award for Distinguished Service to Lexicography and Lexicology in 2017.
