= Nebraska Furniture Mart =

American furniture store

Nebraska Furniture Mart (branded as NFM)
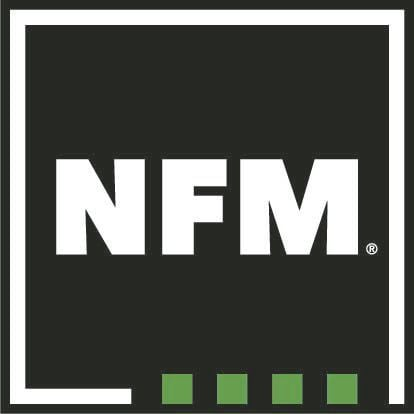
- Logo since 2019
- Type: Subsidiary
- Industry: Home Furnishings Retail
- Founded: 1937; 89 years ago
- Founder: Rose Blumkin
- Headquarters: Omaha, Nebraska, U.S.
- Number of locations: 5
- Area served: Iowa, Kansas, Nebraska, Texas
- Owner: Berkshire Hathaway
- Website: {{nfm.com}

Nebraska Furniture Mart (branded as NFM since 2019) is a home furnishing store in North America that sells furniture, flooring, appliances, and electronics. It is the largest of its kind in North America. NFM was founded in 1937 by Belarus-born Rose Blumkin, who was known as Mrs. B., in Omaha, Nebraska, United States. Under the motto "sell cheap and tell the truth," she worked in the business until age 103. In 1983, Mrs. B. sold a majority interest to Berkshire Hathaway on a handshake deal with Warren Buffett for $60 million.

== History ==
Nebraska Furniture Mart was founded in 1937 by Rose Blumkin in Omaha, Nebraska. Blumkin borrowed the initial $500 investment from her brother while her husband Isadore continued to run their second hand clothing store. At one point early on, the Blumkins had to sell their own home furnishings to pay off a debt. Mrs. B set the Mart apart by selling products cheaper than the other furniture store around. The bigger competitors were able to successfully get the furniture suppliers to stop selling to the Mart because of the prices. Rather than give up and raise prices, Mrs. B went to other suppliers around the country while still underselling her competitors.

In 1983, at age 89, Mrs. B sold 80% of Nebraska Furniture Mart to Warren Buffett in a one-page handshake deal. Buffett bought the company without auditing her inventory or books, instead basing the deal on his own shopping experience at the Mart and his respect for the Blumkin family. Mrs. B sold the business due to her belief that if she sold before her death, her children wouldn't fight over the company. She continued to work at the store, putting in her normal 70-hour work week, using an electric scooter to get around. Soon after the sale, Buffett would say, “Put her up against the top graduates of the top business schools or chief executives of the Fortune 500 and, assuming an even start with the same resources, she’d run rings around them.”

In 1989, at age 95, Mrs. B's family forced her into retirement. Unhappy with this and realizing that Buffett had not made her sign a non-compete agreement, Mrs. B started "Mrs. B’s Clearance and Factory Outlet" across the street from Nebraska Furniture Mart three months later. Two years later, "Mrs. B’s Clearance and Factory Outlet" was profitable and the third largest carpet outlet in Omaha. The following year, Buffett purchased the new store and merged it with the Mart. In 1994, the Mart added an electronics and appliance store.

In 1998, at age 104, Mrs. B died, leaving behind the nation's largest home furnishings store. In 2000, Nebraska Furniture Mart bought Homemakers Furniture and opened the Mart's second location in Clive, Iowa.

In 2003, the Mart opened its third store in Kansas City, Kansas' Village West complex. The opening of the Kansas City store was initially plagued with problems for nearly two years. The store was overwhelmed by the number of customers, which also caused deliveries to lag by more than 30 days. The problems multiplied, because the initial rush of customers never let up. Because of the initial difficulty in getting the large store up and running, NFM president Ron Blumkin initially told Warren Buffett that he never had plans to open another store.

By 2011, this attitude had changed, and Nebraska Furniture Mart announced their fourth and largest location, in The Colony, Texas, which is a far north suburb of Dallas. The problems with the Kansas City location opening would lead to much more long-term planning in the eventual development and opening of the Texas location. The store, called the "Nebraska Furniture Mart of Texas", opened in 2015.

In 2019, the company shortened its name to NFM, as the business decided to shift to expanding beyond the Midwest.

== Locations ==
As of 2020, Nebraska Furniture Mart has five store locations: two in Omaha (including a factory outlet store called "Mrs. B's Clearance Center & Factory Outlet); as well as locations in Iowa, Kansas, and Texas.

NFM operates large-format home-furnishings stores supported by on-site or adjacent distribution facilities. Its Dallas-Fort Worth location in The Colony, Texas, includes a 560,000-square-foot showroom and a distribution center of approximately 1.3 million square feet. The Kansas City, Kansas, location encompasses about 1 million square feet of combined retail and distribution space.

=== Omaha, Nebraska ===
The Omaha, Nebraska store is over 450,000 square feet (42,000 m^{2}) of retail space and is on 78 acres (320,000 m^{2}) of land. The store is located on a single collective campus on South 72nd street in West Omaha, Nebraska. The location is accessible for people with disabilities. In 1994, the store added a massive electronics and appliance store selling computers, software, music, movies and personal electronic items as well as TVs and appliances. The campus also includes Mrs. B's Clearance Center and Factory Outlet. Both the Omaha and Kansas City locations house over 85,000 furniture items, 185,000 appliance and electronics items and over 1,000,000 square yards (840,000 m^{2}) of carpet.

=== Clive, Iowa ===
In 2001, a second store was opened in Clive, Iowa, a suburb of Des Moines. The business occupied this 44,000 square feet (4,100 m^{2}) location until March 2019 when they moved into a 65,000 square feet (6,000 m^{2}) space, formerly occupied by the defunct Dahl's Foods. Because parent company Berkshire Hathaway also owns nearby Homemakers Furniture, the new location does not stock home furnishings. It instead focuses on electronics, appliances, as well as bathroom and lawn products.

=== Kansas City, Kansas ===
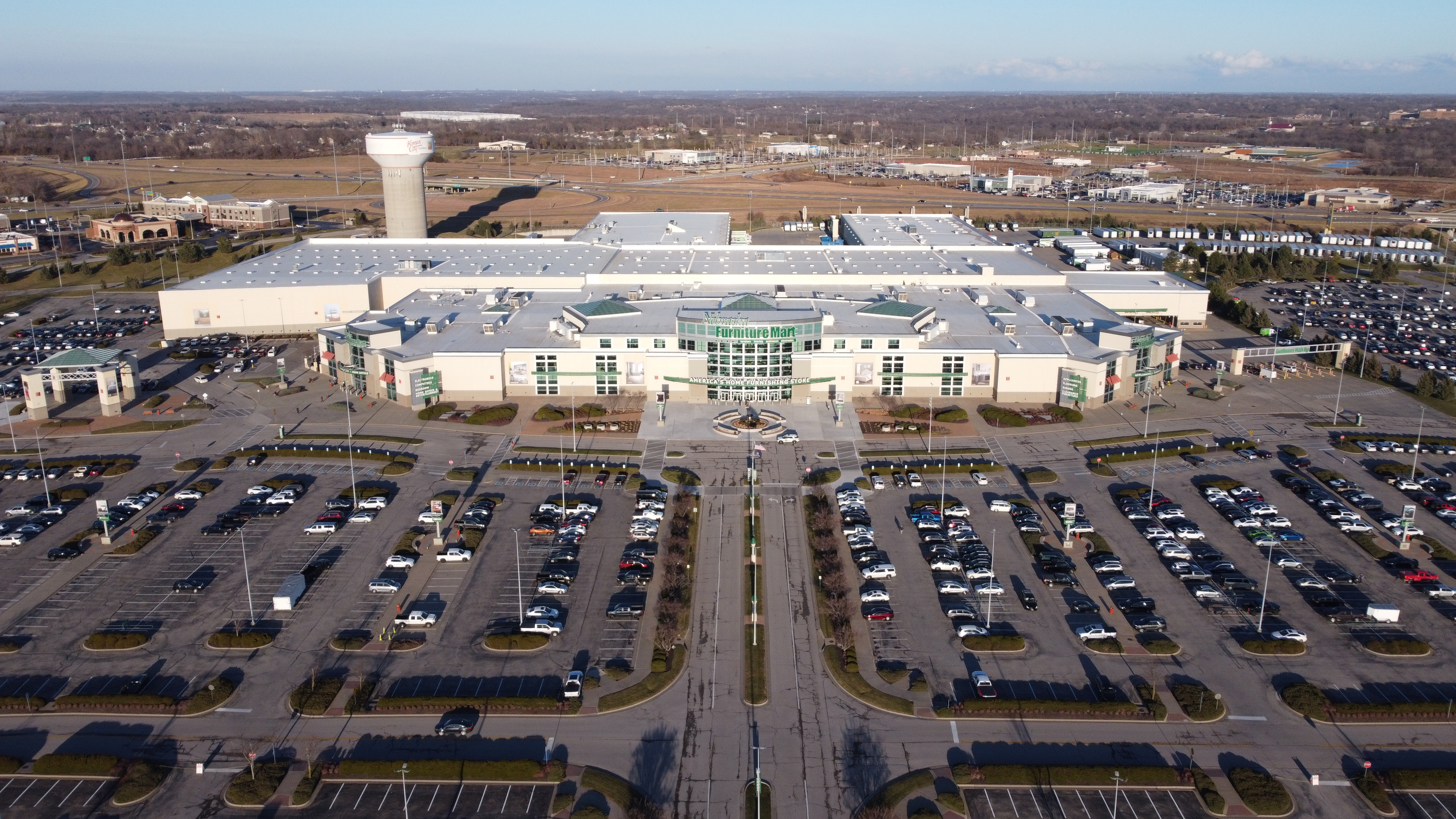
Nebraska Furniture Mart's Kansas City location

The Kansas City store opened in 2003 in the Village West development on the far western edge of Kansas City, Kansas, 12 miles (18 km) west of downtown Kansas City, Missouri. The store is located across from the Kansas Speedway and Sporting Park. It encompasses a total of 1,100,000 square feet (100,000 m^{2}) of retail and warehouse space and is on 88 acres (360,000 m^{2}) of land. It was the first location outside of Omaha to offer the full range of products. It draws visitors from all over the United States and has become a popular tourist attraction.

=== The Colony, Texas ===
On November 9, 2011, Nebraska Furniture Mart announced a plan to expand its retail operation to North Texas. Construction of the new store started in September 2012 in The Colony, which is a far northern suburb of Dallas. The new location had an unadvertised soft opening on March 4, 2015 for friends and family. After training more than 2,000 employees during the two months that followed, the grand opening and ribbon-cutting festivities took place on May 7, 2015. The Colony location is the largest of the four locations, boasting 560,000 square feet (52,000 m^{2}) of retail space and 1,300,000 square feet (120,000 m^{2}) of warehouse/distribution space.

=== Cedar Park, Texas ===
On December 9, 2021, NFM announced it will open a new store in Cedar Park, Texas with an estimated opening date in the year 2026.

== Philanthropy & Community ==
Community involvement has been a recurring part of NFM's operations in the markets it serves. Furniture Today reported in 2023 that the company's NFM Cares program partners with local organizations on issues including food insecurity, neighborhood improvement, and other community needs, while encouraging employee volunteer participation. The Greater Omaha Chamber also recognized NFM in its 2025 Business Excellence Awards for charitable giving, disaster-relief support, and employee volunteer activity.

== Brands & Vendor Relationships ==
NFM has relationships with hundreds of vendors, and many of the partnerships include~~d~~ collaborative efforts designed to provide a unique experience for customers. One recent example is NFM's collaboration with Shaw Industries on Anso Gallery carpet showrooms: Floor Covering Weekly reported in August 2026 that NFM installed its third Anso Gallery at The Colony after earlier installations in Omaha and Kansas City.

== See also ==
- Rose Blumkin Performing Arts Center
