= Beth El Cemetery =

Jewish cemetery in Douglas County, Nebraska, USA

- Interactive map of Beth El Cemetery

Details
- Established: 1939
- Location: Omaha, Nebraska
- Country: United States
- Coordinates: 41°12′40″N 96°02′39″W
- Type: Jewish
- Owned by: Beth El Synagogue
- Size: 3 acres (1.2 ha)
- No. of interments: ~1,700
- Find a Grave: Beth El Cemetery

The Beth El Cemetery is a Jewish cemetery located at 4700 South 84th Street (84th and "L" Streets) in Ralston, a city that is south of Omaha, Nebraska.

== History ==
Beth El Synagogue bought land for the cemetery in 1927, and the cemetery was opened in 1939.

The cemetery is part of the Conservative community of Omaha. It is a medium-sized cemetery that is situated on three acres.

In May 1999, the Etta and Harold Epstein Family Chapel of Remembrance was dedicated on the grounds, enabling congregants to hold indoor services at the cemetery.

== Notable burials ==
- Johnny Rosenblatt (1907–1979), Mayor of Omaha (1954–61)
- Edward Zorinsky (1928–1987), American politician and US Senator
- The cemetery also has graves for Jewish soldiers and officers from Omaha who were killed in World War I, World War II, and other wars

== See also ==
- History of the Jews in Omaha, Nebraska
- List of cemeteries in Omaha
- History of Omaha
