= Fisher Farm Cemetery =

Jewish cemetery in Sarpy County, Nebraska, US

Coordinates: 41°10′21″N 95°58′34″W

- Interactive map of Fisher Farm Cemetery

Details
- Established: 1901
- Country: United States
- Type: Jewish
- Find a Grave: Fisher Farm Cemetery

Fisher Farm Cemetery, including the B'nai Abraham Cemetery, the Hrabik Cemetery, the Beth Hamedrosh Hagadol Cemetery (also called Mt. Sinai Cemetery), and Bnai Abraham Cemetery, is located at 8600 South 42 Street in Bellevue, Nebraska.

== History ==
Willard Fisher, an early Sarpy County farmer, buried his three children on his farm after an epidemic in 1883. His grave and those of his children were later joined by several Jewish congregations.

Fisher Farm Cemetery was established by the Congregation Share Zion in 1901. In 1909, the deed was transferred to Chevra B'nai Yisroel. In 1915, the deed was transferred again to the B'nai Abrahm Society of South Omaha. Eventually, Hrabik, Beth Hamedrosh Hagadol and Bnai Abraham cemeteries would join Fisher Farm Cemetery.

The cemetery is still active, and is nearly full.

== Layout ==
The older section of the cemetery is segregated by gender and age. In one row, adult males are buried side by side down in order of death, while in the next row, adult females are buried in a similar fashion. There are also separate rows designated for children. This arrangement makes it difficult to determine which individuals were married to each other, as spouses are buried in separate rows.

In the new section, couples and families are usually buried together. Another interesting feature is that most of the graves have raised concrete borders and the enclosed area contains ground cover. Most of the more recent markers have Hebrew and English inscriptions, but many of the oldest ones have only Hebrew inscriptions. Some have had English inscriptions added later to the original Hebrew ones.

== See also ==
- List of cemeteries in Omaha
- History of Omaha
