= List of cemeteries in Nebraska =

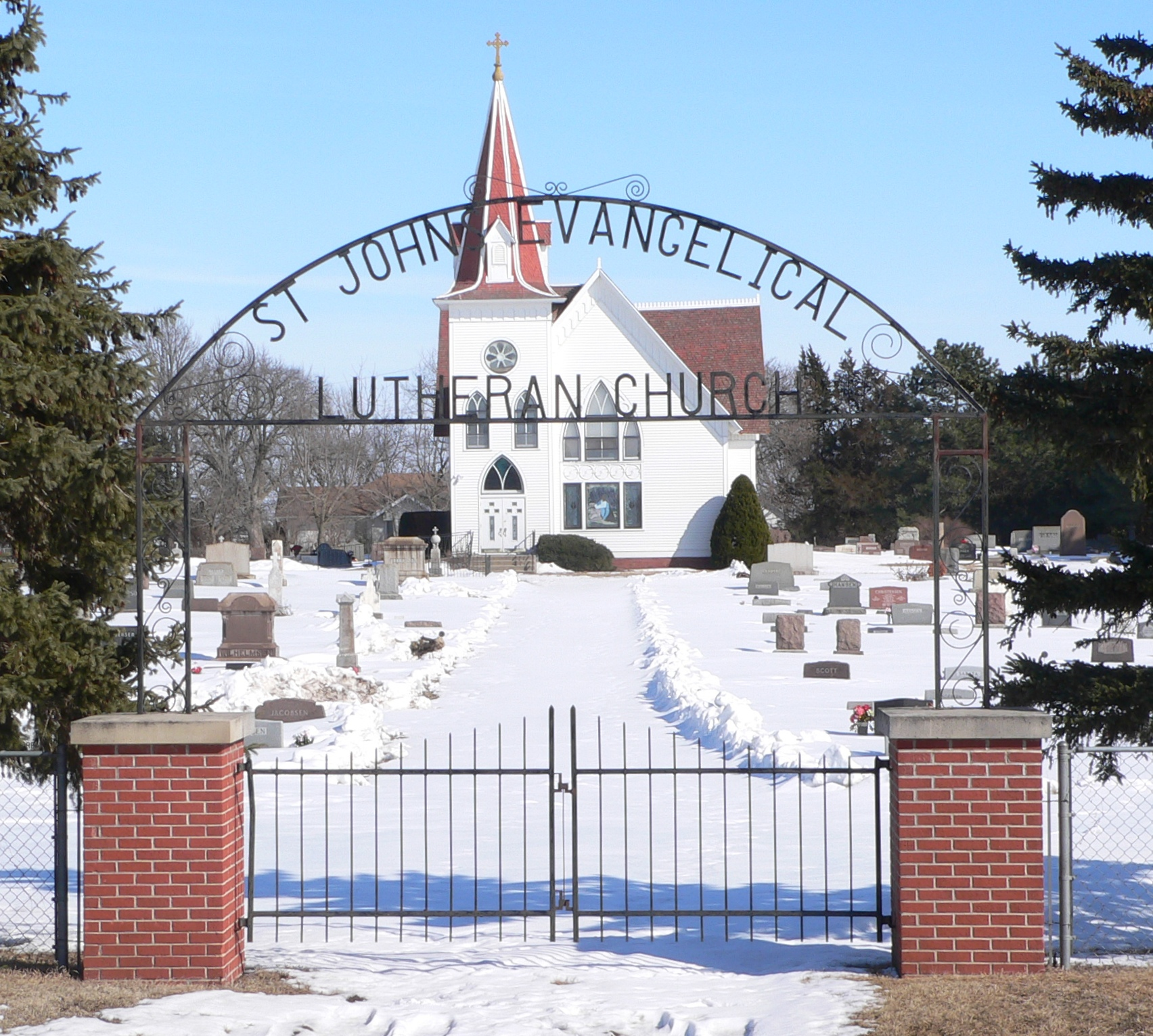
St. John's Evangelical Lutheran Church and graveyard in Kronborg

This list of cemeteries in Nebraska includes notable examples of currently operating, historical (closed for new interments), and defunct (abandoned or removed) cemeteries, churchyards, columbaria, mausolea, and other formal burial grounds. Several cemeteries of historic and/or architectural value are listed on the National Register of Historic Places (NRHP). It does not include pet cemeteries. This list is sorted by county.

== Cherry County ==
- Dry Valley Church and Cemetery, NRHP-listed

== Douglas County ==
- Beth El Cemetery, Ralston
- Forest Lawn Memorial Park, Omaha
- Golden Hill Jewish Cemetery, Omaha
- Laurel Hill Cemetery, Omaha
- Mormon Pioneer Cemetery, Omaha, designated an Omaha Landmark
- Potter's Field, Omaha
- Prospect Hill Cemetery, Omaha, designated an Omaha Landmark
- Springwell Danish Cemetery, Omaha, designated an Omaha Landmark
- Temple Israel Cemetery, Omaha
- Westlawn-Hillcrest Funeral Home and Memorial Park, Omaha, designated an Omaha Landmark
- Pleasant Hill Cemetery
- Shipley Cemetery
- Mount Hope Cemetery
- Bird-Ritchie Cemetery
- Cutler's Park Cemetery

== Hayes County ==
- St. John's Evangelical Lutheran German Church and Cemetery, NRHP-listed

== Lancaster County ==
- Mt. Carmel Cemetery, Lincoln
- Wyuka Cemetery, Lincoln, NRHP-listed

== Lincoln County ==
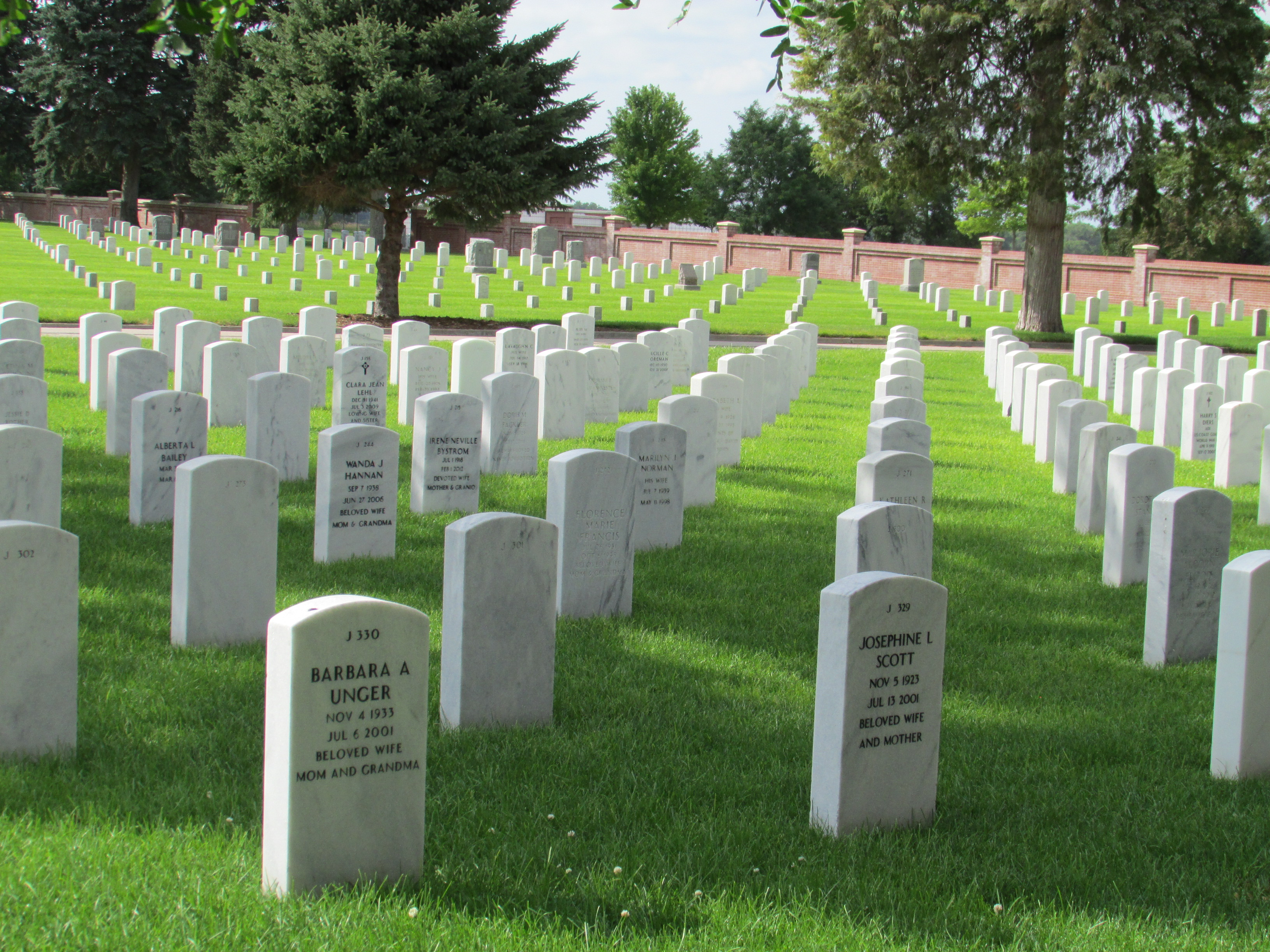
Fort McPherson National Cemetery

- Fort McPherson National Cemetery, NRHP-listed

== Nemaha County ==
- St. John's Lutheran Church Complex, Auburn

== Sarpy County ==
- Fisher Farm Cemetery, Bellevue

== Thurston County ==
- Blackbird Hill, NRHP-listed

== See also ==
- List of cemeteries in the United States
