= National Register of Historic Places listings in Nemaha County, Nebraska =

Location of Nemaha County in Nebraska

Nemaha County, Nebraska, United States, has 14 properties and districts listed on the National Register of Historic Places, including one National Historic Landmark.

The locations of National Register properties and districts for which the latitude and longitude coordinates are included below may be seen in a map.

This National Park Service list is complete through NPS recent listings posted October 30, 2026.

== Listings county-wide ==
	Name on the Register	Image	Date listed	Location	City or town	Description
1	Auburn Historic District	Auburn Historic District	July 14, 2014 (#14000396)	Downtown Commercial District, Courthouse Sq. & Courthouse Ave. 40°23′28″N 95°50′22″W	Auburn	
2	John W. Bennett House	John W. Bennett House	September 16, 1983 (#83001099)	Off Nebraska Highway 67; 40°23′31″N 95°40′30″W	Brownville	
3	Brownville Bridge	Brownville Bridge	June 17, 1993 (#93000536)	U.S. Route 136 over the Missouri River; 40°23′57″N 95°39′06″W	Brownville	Spans Missouri River to Atchison County, Missouri
4	Brownville Historic District	Brownville Historic District	May 19, 1970 (#70000374)	Bounded by Allen, Richard, Nemaha, Nebraska, 7th, and 2nd Sts., and the Missouri River; 40°23′52″N 95°39′18″W	Brownville	
5	CAPTAIN MERIWETHER LEWIS (dredge)	CAPTAIN MERIWETHER LEWIS (dredge)	October 28, 1977 (#77000833)	Southeast of Brownville; 40°23′41″N 95°39′02″W	Brownville	
6	First United Presbyterian Church of Auburn	First United Presbyterian Church of Auburn	July 15, 1982 (#82003199)	1322 19th St. 40°23′08″N 95°50′37″W	Auburn	
7	Legion Memorial Park	Legion Memorial Park	December 29, 2004 (#04001407)	Generally bounded by 10th St., 11th St., H St., and J St. 40°23′39″N 95°50′14″W	Auburn	
8	Thomas J. Majors Farmstead	Thomas J. Majors Farmstead	June 15, 1978 (#78001707)	West of Peru at 800 Mulberry St. 40°29′04″N 95°44′09″W	Peru	
9	Nemaha County Courthouse	Nemaha County Courthouse	January 10, 1990 (#89002243)	1824 N St. 40°23′08″N 95°50′40″W	Auburn	
10	New Opera House	New Opera House	September 28, 1988 (#88000936)	921 Central Ave. 40°23′34″N 95°50′19″W	Auburn	
11	Wilber T. Reed House	Wilber T. Reed House	March 24, 1980 (#80002458)	1204 N St. 40°23′33″N 95°50′40″W	Auburn	
12	St. John's Lutheran Church Complex	St. John's Lutheran Church Complex	January 25, 1979 (#79001452)	63289 725 Rd. 40°20′00″N 95°57′26″W	Auburn	
13	Nella Aldrich Stoddard Farm		March 31, 2025 (#100011587)	Address Restricted	Auburn	
14	US Post Office-Auburn	US Post Office-Auburn	May 11, 1992 (#92000480)	1320 Courthouse Ave. 40°23′28″N 95°50′23″W	Auburn	One of 12 Nebraska post offices featuring a Section of Fine Arts mural, "Threshing" (1939) by Ethel Magafan.

== See also ==
- List of National Historic Landmarks in Nebraska
- National Register of Historic Places listings in Nebraska
