= New Opera House =

New Opera House may refer to:

- New Opera House (Auburn, Nebraska), listed on the National Register of Historic Places in Nemaha County, Nebraska
- New Opera House (Charles Town, West Virginia), listed on the National Register of Historic Places in West Virginia
- New Opera House, Melbourne, became the Tivoli Theatre in 1914
