= Chad Kelsay =

American football player (born 1977)

No. 97
- Position: Linebacker

Personal information
- Born: April 9, 1977 (age 49); Auburn, Nebraska, U.S.
- Listed height: 6 ft 2 in (1.88 m)
- Listed weight: 252 lb (114 kg)

Career information
- High school: Auburn (Nebraska)
- College: Nebraska (1995–1998)
- NFL draft: 1999: 7th round, 219th overall pick

Career history
- Pittsburgh Steelers (1999); St. Louis Rams (2000)*
- * Offseason or practice squad member only

Awards and highlights
- 2× National champion (1995, 1997); Second-team All-Big 12 (1998); Third-team All-Big 12 (1997)
- Stats at Pro Football Reference

Chad T. Kelsay (born April 9, 1977) is an American former professional football linebacker who played one season with the Pittsburgh Steelers of the National Football League (NFL). He was selected by the Steelers in the seventh round of the 1999 NFL draft. He played college football at the University of Nebraska–Lincoln. He was also a member of the St. Louis Rams.

== Early life ==
Chad T. Kelsay was born on April 9, 1977, in Auburn, Nebraska. He played high school football at Auburn High School as a linebacker and tailback. As a senior in 1994, he totaled 100 tackles, three interceptions, four forced fumbles, one fumble recovery, one blocked punt, 931 rushing yards, 13 rushing touchdowns, 14 catches, 235 receiving yards, and four receiving touchdowns. He was also the team's extra point kicker and kicked two 43-yard field goals his senior year. Kelsay was named a first-team all-state linebacker by the Omaha World Herald and the Lincoln Journal Star. He also earned Bluechip Illustrated All-American honors. He participated in track and basketball as well, finishing fifth in the state triple jump in 1994 and averaging 23 points and 10 rebounds per game in basketball. He was also a member of the National Honor Society.

== College career ==
Kelsay was a four-year letterman for the Nebraska Cornhuskers of the University of Nebraska–Lincoln from to 1995 to 1998. He played in 11 games his freshman year in 1995, totaling 13 solo tackles, seven assisted tackles, two sacks, and three pass breakups. The 1995 Cornhuskers were consensus national champions. Kelsay appeared in 11 games during the 1996 season, recording ten solo tackles, 13 assisted tackles, and 2.5 sacks. He missed one game that year due to a knee strain. He played in all 12 games, starting ten, in 1997, accumulating 13 solo tackles, 21 assisted tackles, and three sacks while being named third-Team All-Big 12 by the Coaches. The 1997 Cornhuskers were Coaches Poll national champions. Kelsay started all 12 games his senior year in 1998, recording 33 solo tackles, 39 assisted tackles, five sacks, one interception and four pass breakups. He was named second-team All-Big 12 by both the Associated Press and the Coaches that season. Kelsay was also a three-time first-team Academic All-Big 12 selection from 1996 to 1998 and a first-team GTE/CoSIDA Academic All-American in 1998. He graduated in May 1999 with a bachelor's degree in finance. He was inducted into the Nebraska Football Hall of Fame in 2017.

== Professional career ==
Kelsay was selected by the Pittsburgh Steelers in the seventh round, with the 219th overall pick, of the 1999 NFL draft. He officially signed with the team on July 8. He played in six games for the Steelers during the 1999 season, recording three solo tackles and one assisted tackle. Kelsay was waived on August 27, 2000.

Kelsay was claimed off waivers by the St. Louis Rams on August 29, 2000. He was waived on September 5, 2000.

== Personal life ==
On October 4, 2003, Kelsay was arrested for disturbing the peace at an Amigos restaurant in Lincoln, Nebraska. He later became the executive vice president of sales for a truck company. His brother Chris Kelsay also played in the NFL.
