= Wilber T. Reed House =

Historic house in Nebraska, United States

- U.S. National Register of Historic Places
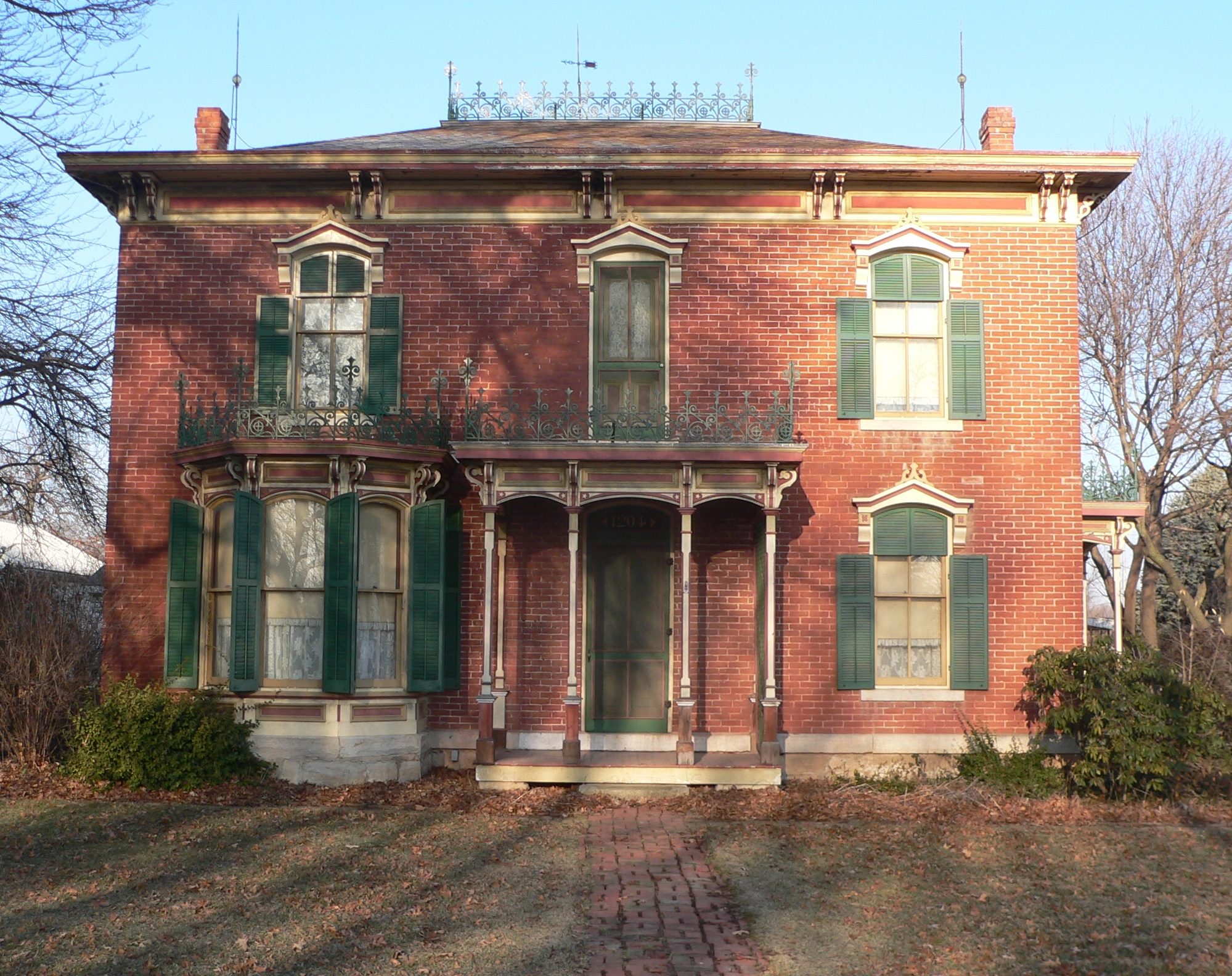
- The house in 2013

- Location within Nebraska Location within the United States
- Location: 1204 North Street, Auburn, Nebraska
- Coordinates: 40°23′33″N 95°50′39″W
- Area: less than one acre
- Built: 1884
- Architectural style: Italianate
- NRHP reference No.: 80002458
- Added to NRHP: March 24, 1980

The Wilbert T. Reed House is a historic house in Auburn, Nebraska. It was built in 1884 for Wilmer T. Reed, a settler from Ohio. Reed became a grocer in Auburn, then known as Sheridan, in 1875, only seven years after the town had been established. His house was designed in the Italianate architectural style. It has been listed on the National Register of Historic Places since March 24, 1980.
