= Auburn High School (Nebraska) =

Location
- 1829 Central Avenue; Auburn, Nebraska; United States; 40°23′33″N 95°51′01″W

Information
- Type: Public
- School district: Auburn Public Schools
- Teaching staff: 19.05 (on FTE basis)
- Grades: 6 to 12
- Enrollment: 247 (2022-2023)
- Student to teacher ratio: 12.97
- Colors: Red and white
- Athletics conference: East Central Nebraska Conference
- Nickname: Bulldogs
- Website: Auburn High School

Auburn High School serves the towns of Auburn, Peru, Julian, Howe, Brownville, and the surrounding area in southeast Nebraska, United States. The building is used as classrooms for students in grades 6–12, and contains a wrestling room, weight room, a gym, and four locker rooms.

== Academics ==
On the majority of state standardized testing, AHS has had at least 90% of students receiving proficient marks. Auburn has a 94% percent graduation rate, and 99.22% of its teachers are endorsed by the state. AHS offers two Advanced Placement classes, AP Calculus AB and Statistics, and dual-credit courses to prepare students for college.

AHS has had a Speech team that won the NSAA State Championship in Class B in 2000. In 1998 it was the runner-up in Class B. The speech team has a long history of success with many district championships, and won districts for two consecutive seasons.

In 2014 Auburn High School founded a Quiz Bowl team, and in 2016, in their second year of competition, they achieved fourth place at an All Class State Tournament.

== Athletics ==
Auburn High School's athletics mascot is the Bulldog. AHS has had major success in NSAA sports, most notably a Class C football state championship in 2006 in which the Bulldogs went undefeated. More recently, Auburn took the Girls' Class B Track and Field Championship. The Bulldogs also won the runner-up title in 2009 at the NSAA wrestling championship. Notable alumni of Auburn's athletic programs include Chris Kelsay and Chad Kelsay. The boys' basketball team also won back to back state championships in 2019, 2020, and 2021.

== Alumni ==
- Julie Slama
- Carter Hamann
- Kade Reiman
