= Nemaha County Courthouse (Nebraska) =

- U.S. National Register of Historic Places
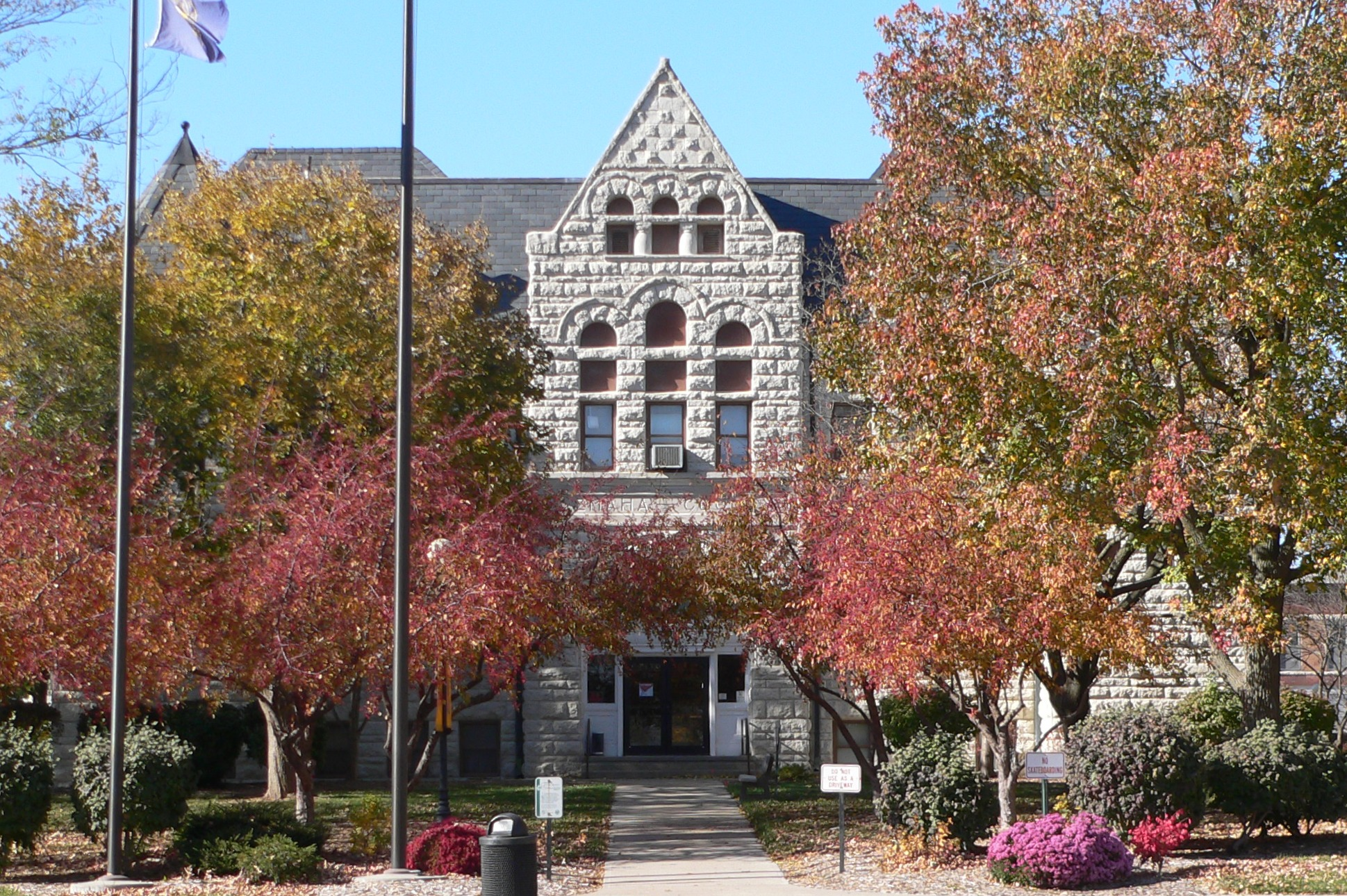
- The building in 2010

- Location within Nebraska Location within the United States
- Location: 1824 North Street, Auburn, Nebraska
- Coordinates: 40°23′08″N 95°50′40″W
- Area: 2 acres (0.81 ha)
- Built: 1899
- Built by: W. M. Rowles & Company
- Architect: George A. Berlinghof
- Architectural style: Richardsonian Romanesque
- MPS: County Courthouses of Nebraska MPS
- NRHP reference No.: 89002243
- Added to NRHP: January 10, 1990

The Nemaha County Courthouse is a historic building in Auburn, Nebraska, and the courthouse of Nemaha County, Nebraska. It was built by W. M. Rowles & Company in 1899, and designed in the Romanesque Revival style by German-born architect George A. Berlinghof. It has been listed on the National Register of Historic Places since January 10, 1990.
