= First United Presbyterian Church (Auburn, Nebraska) =

Historic church in Nebraska, United States

- First United Presbyterian Church of Auburn
- U.S. National Register of Historic Places
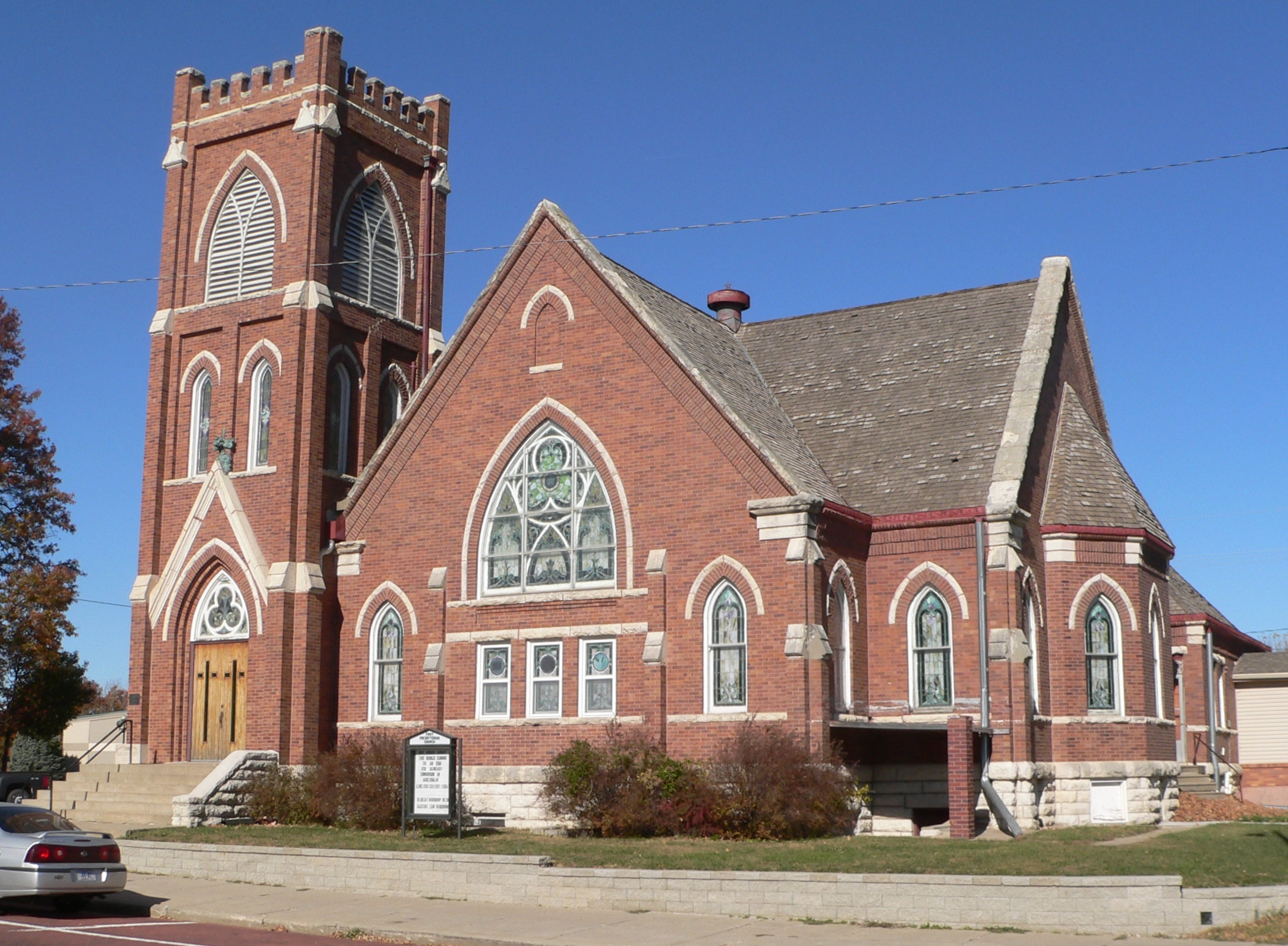

- Location within Nebraska Location within the United States
- Location: 1322 19th St. Auburn, Nebraska
- Coordinates: 40°23′8″N 95°50′37″W
- Built: 1906
- Architect: Eisenbrant, Pattenger and Colby
- Architectural style: Late Gothic Revival
- NRHP reference No.: 82003199
- Added to NRHP: July 15, 1982

First United Presbyterian Church is a historic Presbyterian church now located at 1322 19th Street in Auburn, Nebraska, United States.

The church was organized in 1887 as the Calvert Presbyterian Church. The building, built in 1906, was designed by Eisenbrant, Pattenger and Colby in Late Gothic Revival style, with auditorium style seating and other features of an Akron Plan church. On July 15, 1982, it was added to the National Register of Historic Places. It now uses the name of "First Presbyterian Church".
