= St. John's Lutheran Church Complex =

- U.S. National Register of Historic Places
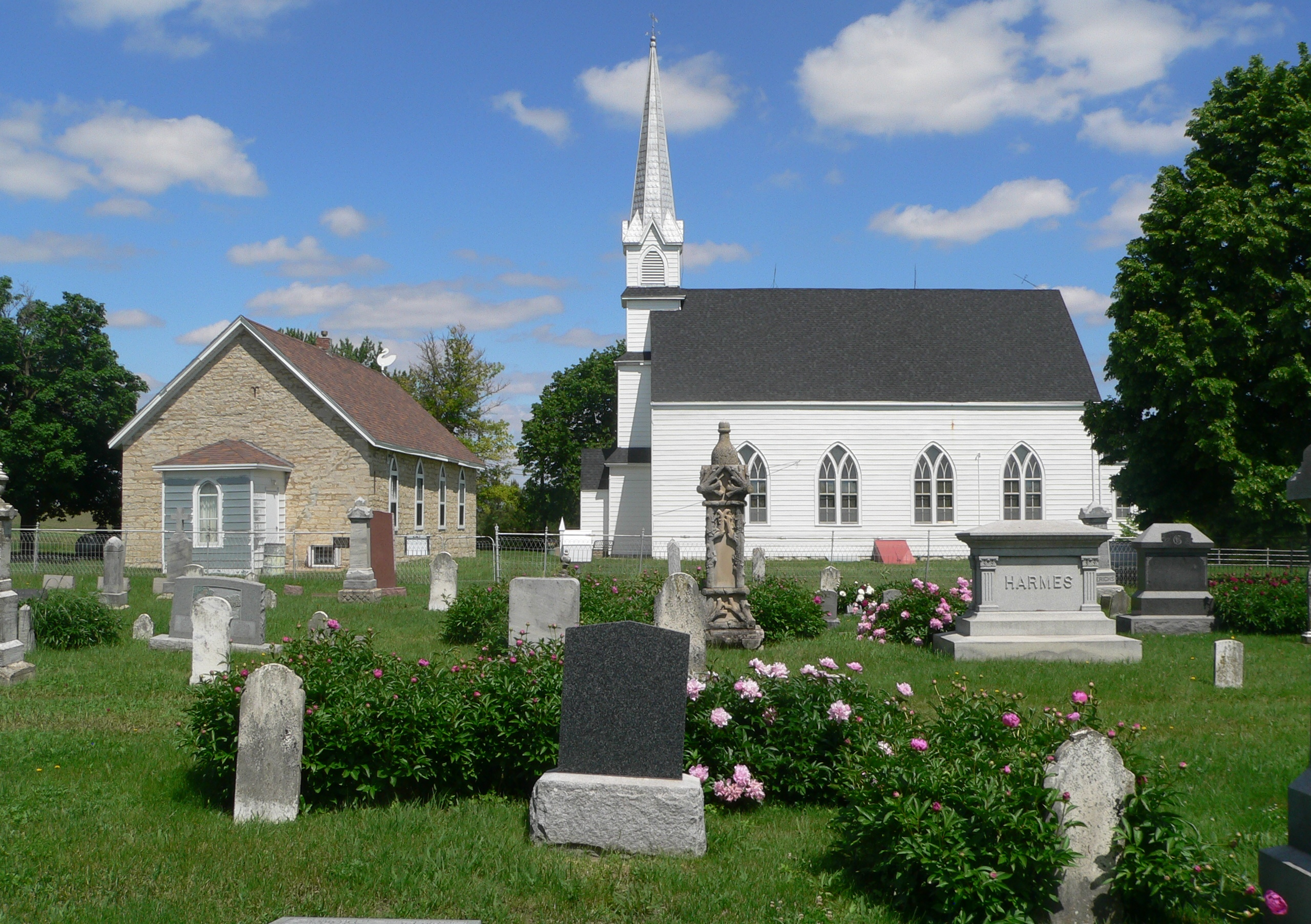
- The church complex in 2013

- Location within Nebraska Location within the United States
- Nearest city: Auburn, Nebraska
- Coordinates: 40°19′59″N 95°57′24″W
- Area: 3 acres (1.2 ha)
- Built: 1868
- Architectural style: Late Gothic Revival
- NRHP reference No.: 79001452
- Added to NRHP: January 25, 1979

St. John's Lutheran Church Complex is a historic church complex, including two church buildings, a parsonage, and a cemetery, in Auburn, Nebraska, United States. The Old Stone church was built in 1867–1868, and designed by Christian Schwan, a German immigrant. Another church was built in 1903, and designed in the Late Gothic Revival architectural style. A two-story parsonage was completed in 1925. The complex includes a cemetery with over 500 tombstones. The church complex has been listed on the National Register of Historic Places since January 25, 1979.
