= King's Food Host =

1955–1974 fast food chain in the United States

King's Food Host was a fast food chain restaurant that operated in the United States from 1955–1974. It was founded in Lincoln, Nebraska by Larry and Esther Price and James King. At its peak, King's operated 150 stores across 17 midwestern states and Manitoba, often near universities.

== Format and menu ==
Like some chains of the era, at most King's locations, customers would call their order into the kitchen via tableside phones. Some locations also had car service. Alongside burgers and hot dogs, King's signature innovation was the "Cheese Frenchee", also known as "Frenchies", a batter-dipped, deep-fried cheese sandwich. The Frenchee was also available with tuna salad. Other best-selling items included onion rings, malts, and shakes. As of 2025, versions of the sandwich are still available at Donnie & Millie's and Amigo's/King's Classic locations across Nebraska.

== Demise ==
Larry Price had a rigid policy that he would not permit cigarette machines to be installed in King's, because he believed they would encourage minors to smoke, despite this being a common revenue stream for restaurants. By 1971, King's began posting losses due in part to overexpansion, causing the Prices to sell in 1972.

Exacerbating the lost cigarette revenues and overleveraged expansion was the Nixon shock of 1971. Under the temporary policy, suppliers could generally continue to raise prices, but retail prices were fixed for 90 days, leaving restaurants vulnerable to rising input costs. In the wake of the Nixon shock, the 1973-75 recession depressed retail demand just as the debt-burdened King's could least afford it. In 1974, King's new investors filed Chapter 11 bankruptcy, from which it never recovered.
