= Auburn United States Post Office =

- US Post Office-Auburn
- U.S. National Register of Historic Places
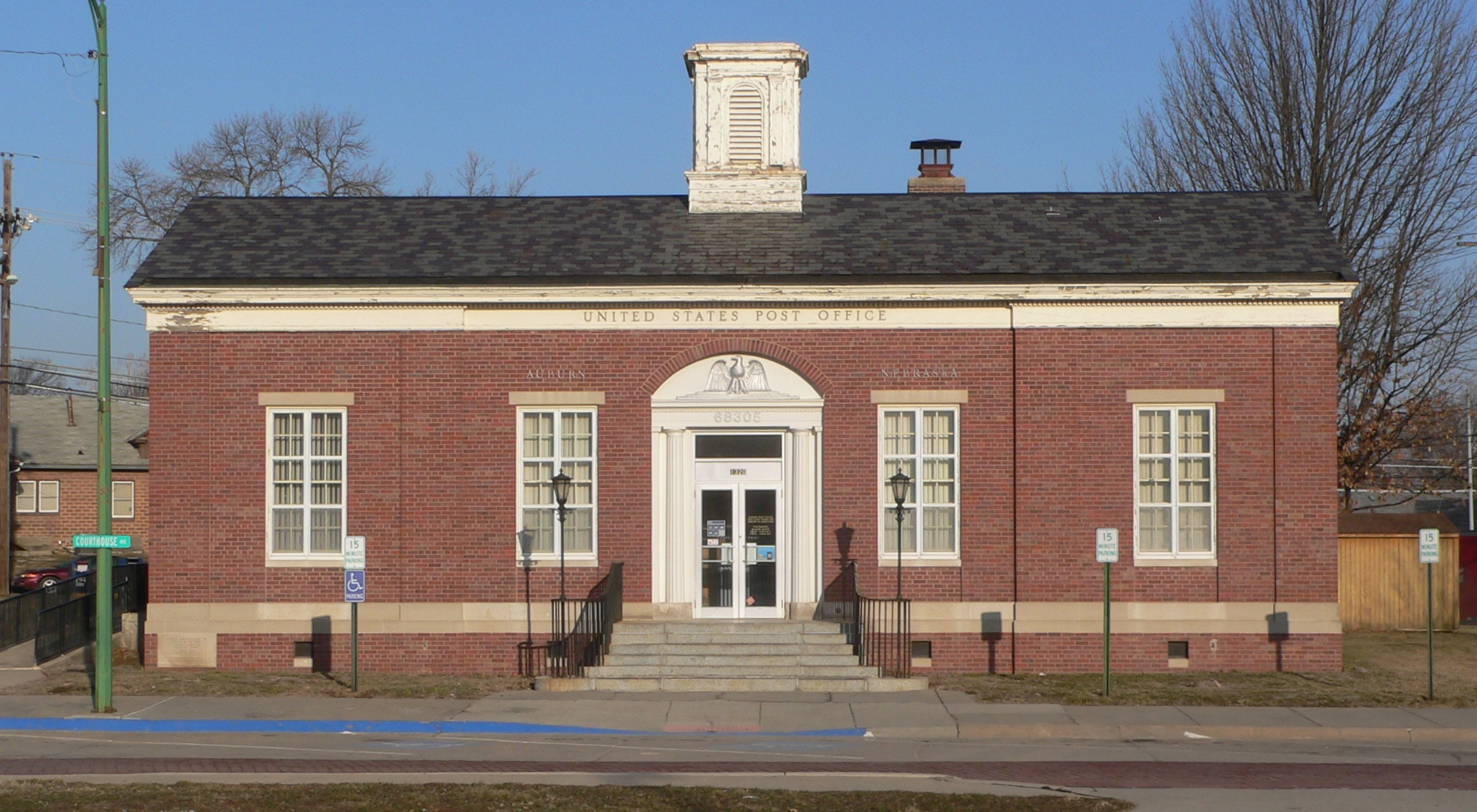
- The building in 2013

- Location within Nebraska Location within the United States
- Location: 1320 Courthouse Avenue, Auburn, Nebraska
- Coordinates: 40°23′27″N 95°50′22″W
- Area: less than one acre
- Built: 1936
- Architectural style: Georgian Revival
- MPS: Nebraska Post Offices Which Contain Section Artwork MPS
- NRHP reference No.: 92000480
- Added to NRHP: May 11, 1992

The Auburn United States Post Office is a historic building in Auburn, Nebraska. It was built in 1936–1937, and designed in the Georgian Revival architectural style. Inside, there is a mural by Ethel Magafan, completed in June 1938. The building has been listed on the National Register of Historic Places since May 11, 1992. It was recorded in the NRIS database as US Post Office-Auburn.
