= New Opera House (Auburn, Nebraska) =

- U.S. National Register of Historic Places
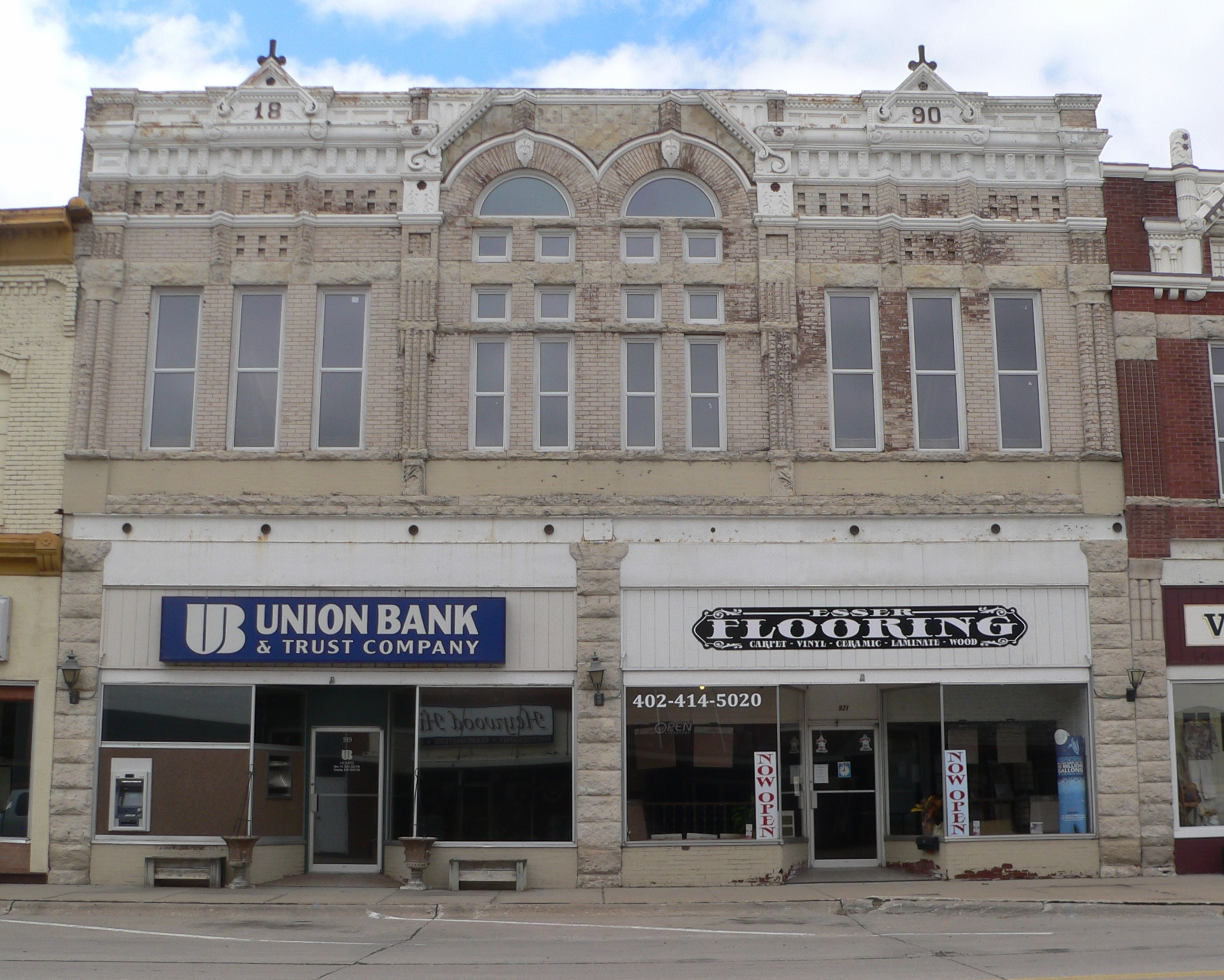
- The building in 2013

- Location within Nebraska Location within the United States
- Location: 921 Central Avenue, Auburn, Nebraska
- Coordinates: 40°23′33″N 95°50′18″W
- Area: less than one acre
- Built: 1894
- Built by: William Dorrum
- Architectural style: Two-part commercial block
- MPS: Opera House Buildings in Nebraska 1867-1917 MPS
- NRHP reference No.: 88000936
- Added to NRHP: September 28, 1988

The New Opera House is a historic building in Auburn, Nebraska. It was built by William Dorrum in 1894 for the Auburn Building and Improvement Association. Over the years, it hosted many performances and political events, including speeches by Congressman/Senator Elmer Burkett as well as Governor George L. Sheldon. It has been listed on the National Register of Historic Places since September 28, 1988.
