= John W. Bennett House =

- U.S. National Register of Historic Places
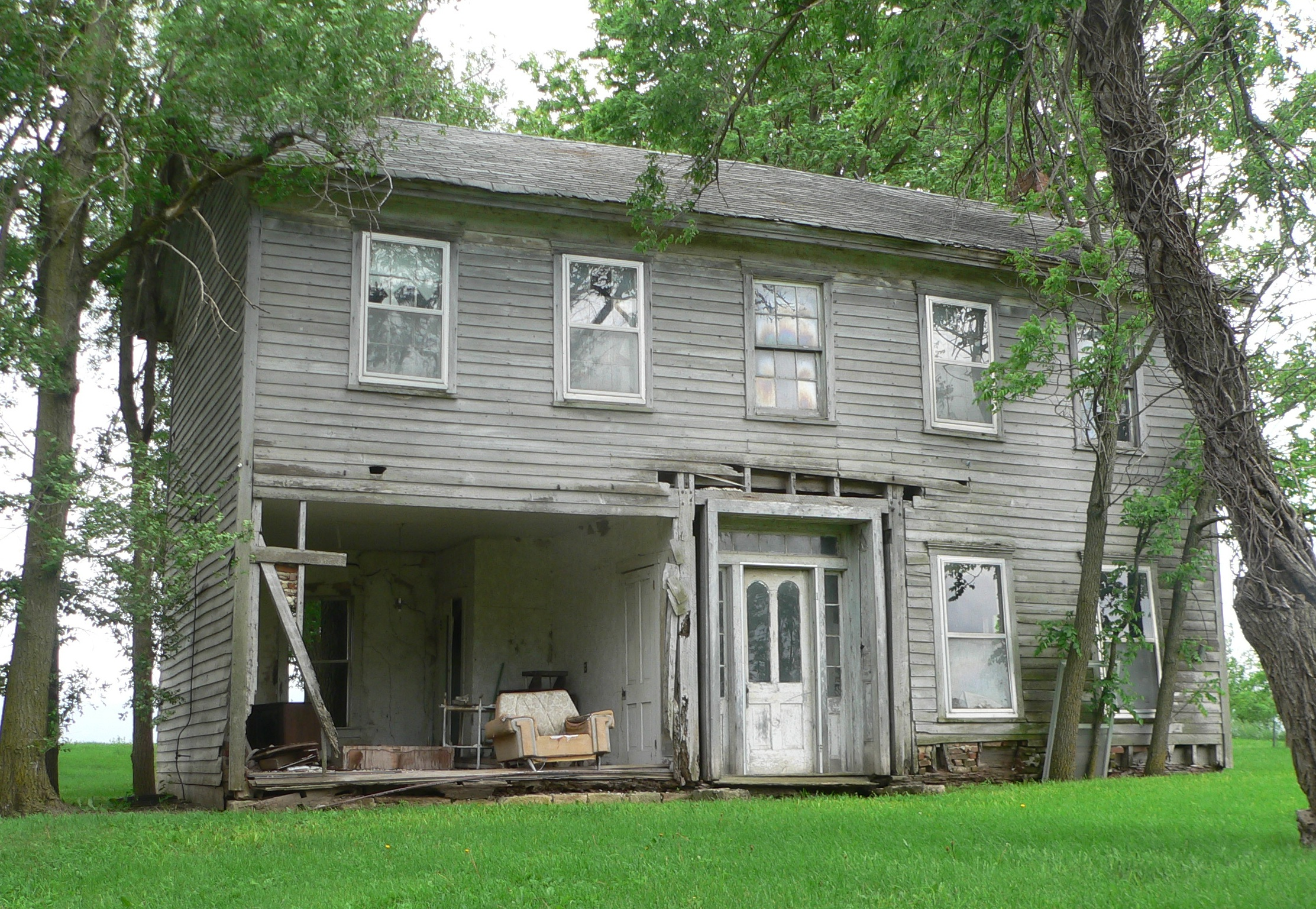
- The house in 2013

- Location within Nebraska Location within the United States
- Nearest city: Brownville, Nebraska
- Coordinates: 40°23′30″N 95°40′29″W
- Area: less than one acre
- Built: 1868
- Built by: Mr. Workman
- Architectural style: I House
- NRHP reference No.: 83001099
- Added to NRHP: September 16, 1983

The John W. Bennett House is a historic two-story house in Brownville, Nebraska. It was built in 1868 as an I-house for John W. Bennett, a farmer from Kentucky. It is "the oldest, dated example of the I-house in Nebraska." It has been listed on the National Register of Historic Places since September 16, 1983.
