= Chris Kelsay =

American football player (born 1979)

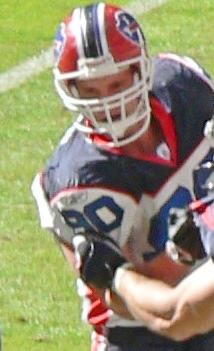
- Kelsay with the Buffalo Bills in 2006

No. 90
- Position: Defensive end

Personal information
- Born: October 31, 1979 (age 47); Auburn, Nebraska, U.S.
- Listed height: 6 ft 4 in (1.93 m)
- Listed weight: 263 lb (119 kg)

Career information
- High school: Auburn (NE)
- College: Nebraska
- NFL draft: 2003: 2nd round, 48th overall pick

Career history
- Buffalo Bills (2003–2012)

Awards and highlights
- Second-team All-American (2001); Second-team All-Big 12 (2001)

Career NFL statistics
- Total tackles: 440
- Sacks: 32.5
- Forced fumbles: 8
- Fumble recoveries: 6
- Interceptions: 3
- Defensive touchdowns: 1
- Stats at Pro Football Reference

Christopher Kelsay (born October 31, 1979) is an American former professional football player who played his entire career as a defensive end for the Buffalo Bills of the National Football League (NFL). He played college football for the Nebraska Cornhuskers. Kelsay was selected by the Bills in the second round (48th overall) of the 2003 NFL draft and was the sixth defensive end chosen in the draft.

== Early life ==
He attended Auburn High School in Auburn, Nebraska He was an all-state defensive lineman as a senior after recording 142 tackles (69 solos), 14 sacks, 3 fumbles forced, and two fumble recoveries. In 1996, he was an all-state linebacker, leading Auburn to the state semifinals. He also played tight end on offense. In basketball, he was a two-time All-Class C-1 basketball selection, averaging 16 points and 8.4 rebounds a game, in helping Auburn to a 17–3 record in 1997–98. In track, he finished fifth in the Class B shot put and had a personal-best throw of 56 ft 11 1/2 in (17.361 m).

== College career ==
Then he went on to play for the Nebraska Cornhuskers for college football. He was inducted into the NCAA scholar-athlete Hall of Fame in 2002. In 43 games at Nebraska, recorded 135 tackles (61 solos) with 13 sacks, 33 stops for losses, 43 quarterback pressures, 9 pass deflections and 2 forced fumbles He earned Verizon/CoSIDA Academic All-District VII honors in each of his last three seasons and in 2002 was a National Football Foundation/College Hall of Fame Scholar-Athlete ($18,000 postgraduate scholarship recipient) As a senior started the first six and final three games at right defensive end and recorded 38 tackles (17 solos) with seven sacks, 13 stops for losses and 18 QB pressures and was Second-team All-Big 12 Conference. As a junior, he was a Second-team All-America selection by Football News as well as a Second-team Consensus All-Big 12 Conference pick after starting every game at right defensive end and recording a career-high 52 tackles (27 solos) with five sacks and 17 stops for losses. He graduated in December 2002 with a 3.6 GPA and a degree in finance.

== Professional career ==
Pre-draft measurables
Height	Weight	Arm length	Hand span	40-yard dash	10-yard split	20-yard split	Vertical jump	Broad jump	Bench press
6 ft 4 3/8 in (1.94 m)	273 lb (124 kg)	32 1/2 in (0.83 m)	9 7/8 in (0.25 m)	4.78 s	1.63 s	2.76 s	36.5 in (0.93 m)	10 ft 1 in (3.07 m)	23 reps
All values from NFL Combine

Selected in the second round of the 2003 NFL Draft (48th overall) by the Buffalo Bills and was the sixth defensive end selected in the draft. As a rookie Kelsay played in 16 games and made 19 tackles. In 2004, he played 16 games and made nine starts and recorded 40 tackles and 4.5 sacks along with 14 QB pressures. In 2005, he started all 16 games and made 41 tackles and 2.5 sacks. Kelsay produced a career season in 2006 where saw career highs in tackles with 88 and sacks posting 5.5. He was about to enter the free agent market in 2007 but was re-signed before free agency started to a 4-year, $23 Million deal. He has played in every game since 2003. In 2007, he was voted as a defensive captain and started the first 11 games of the season and missed the rest due to injuries. Kelsay announced his retirement on February 27, 2013, after 10 seasons in the NFL, all with the Buffalo Bills.

== NFL career statistics ==
Legend
**Bold**	Career high

Year	Team	Games		Tackles					Interceptions					Fumbles			
Year	Team	GP	GS	Cmb	Solo	Ast	Sck	TFL	Int	Yds	TD	Lng	PD	FF	FR	Yds	TD
2003	BUF	**16**	0	19	12	7	0.0	2	0	0	0	0	0	0	0	0	0
2004	BUF	**16**	10	38	23	15	4.5	8	**1**	3	0	3	2	1	**2**	0	0
2005	BUF	**16**	**16**	45	26	19	2.5	3	**1**	**17**	0	**17**	4	1	1	**2**	0
2006	BUF	**16**	**16**	62	41	21	**5.5**	7	0	0	0	0	2	1	1	0	0
2007	BUF	14	14	43	34	9	2.5	**9**	**1**	0	**1**	0	3	0	1	0	0
2008	BUF	**16**	**16**	47	33	14	2.0	**9**	0	0	0	0	**5**	1	0	0	0
2009	BUF	**16**	**16**	62	41	21	5.0	6	0	0	0	0	0	1	1	0	0
2010	BUF	**16**	**16**	**72**	**46**	**26**	3.5	5	0	0	0	0	3	1	0	0	0
2011	BUF	12	12	41	25	16	5.0	3	0	0	0	0	2	**2**	0	0	0
2012	BUF	9	4	14	12	2	2.0	4	0	0	0	0	0	0	0	0	0
		147	120	443	293	150	32.5	56	3	20	1	17	21	8	6	2	0

== Personal life ==
His brother, Chad Kelsay, also played in the NFL. Kelsay was married on March 13, 2004; his wife's name is Natalie and they had a daughter, Harper, on February 9, 2006. Kelsay is the son of Steve and Jackie Kelsay.
