= Thomas J. Majors Farmstead =

- Majors, Thomas J., Farmstead
- U.S. National Register of Historic Places
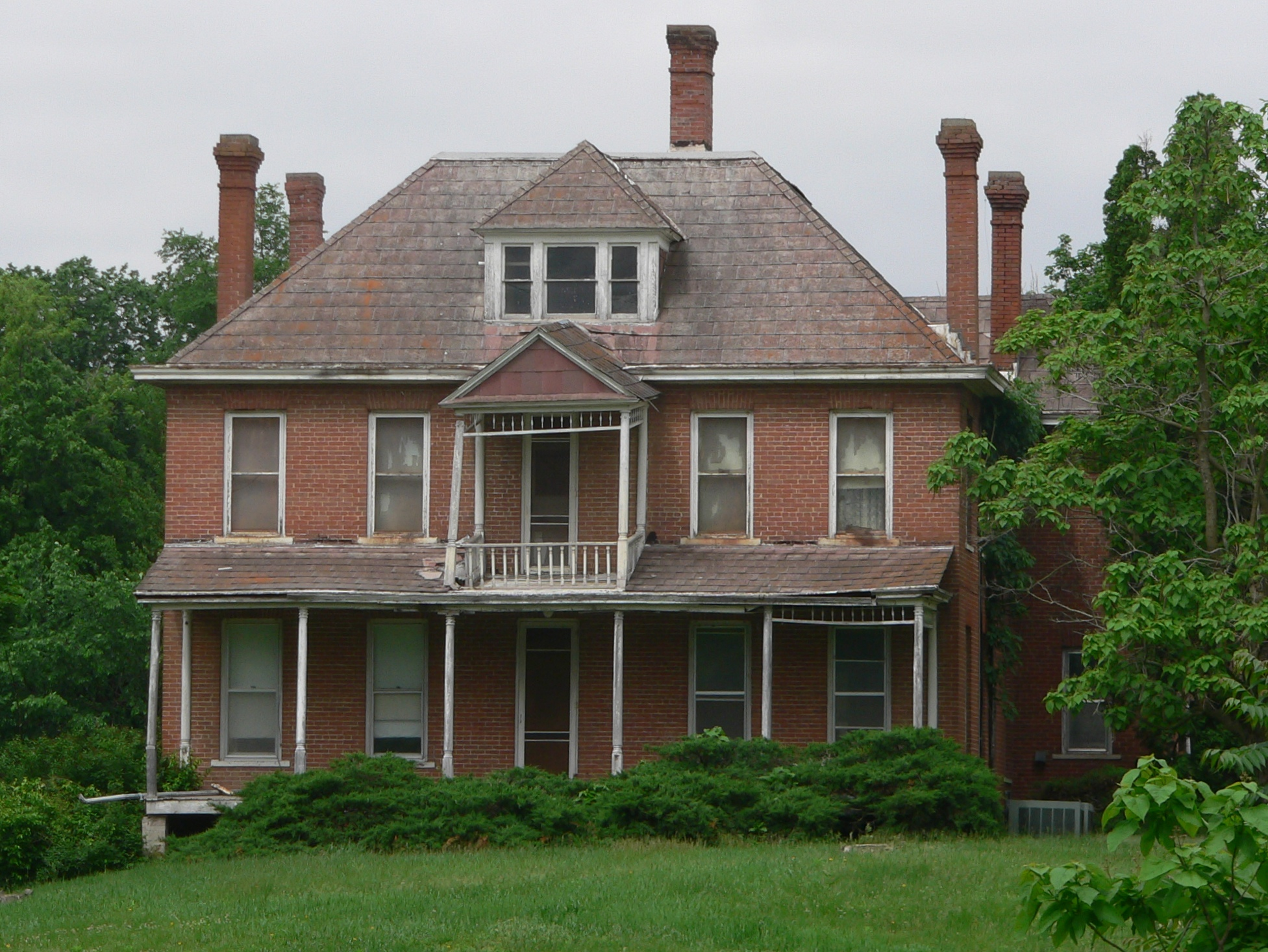
- The house in 2013

- Location within Nebraska Location within the United States
- Nearest city: Peru, Nebraska
- Coordinates: 40°29′04″N 95°44′09″W
- Area: 2 acres (0.81 ha)
- Built: 1898
- NRHP reference No.: 78001707
- Added to NRHP: June 15, 1978

The Thomas J. Majors Farmstead is a historic estate with a two-story house in Peru, Nebraska. The house was built in 1898 for Thomas Jefferson Majors, after he had served as a member of the United States House of Representatives from 1878 to 1879, and as Nebraska's lieutenant governor from 1891 to 1895. The house has been listed on the National Register of Historic Places since June 15, 1978.
