= Dry Valley Church and Cemetery =

Historic site in Cherry County, Nebraska, US

- U.S. National Register of Historic Places
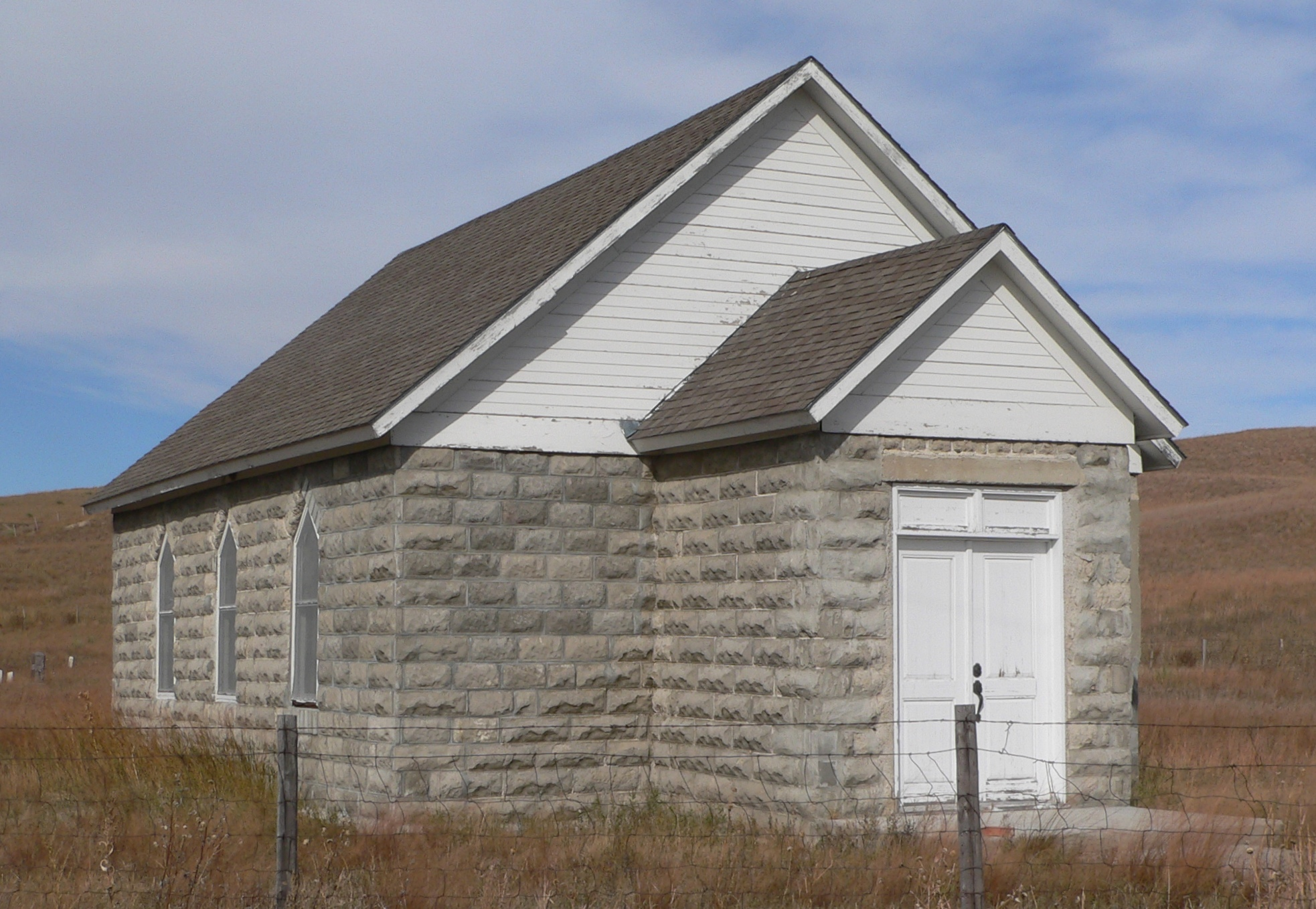

- Location within Nebraska Location within the United States
- Nearest city: Mullen, Nebraska
- Coordinates: 42.26372°N 101.08569°W
- Area: 5 acres (2.0 ha)
- Built: 1911
- Built by: Holland, E.L.
- NRHP reference No.: 07000660
- Added to NRHP: July 3, 2007

The Dry Valley Church and Cemetery, near Mullen, Nebraska, is a historic church that is listed on the National Register of Historic Places. The cemetery has about 80 graves.

Religious services in the area were begun in the early 1900s. A Sunday school was organized in 1909. In 1910 tent meetings at Wells, Nebraska were started. Plans for the "Dry Valley Union Congregational Church" were set in 1910, land was donated by Robert Boyer, and the cornerstone was laid on June 3, 1911. It was built of concrete blocks by E.L. Holland. The membership withdrew from the Congregational denomination in 1924; a Methodist church held funerals and selected other services thereafter. The church was not used for services from 1958 until 1986, when a group of women led a restoration effort.

According to a website in 2013, the church hosts services at Christmas and at Memorial Day, and can be visited by appointment.

It was listed on the National Register of Historic Places in 2007. The listing included one contributing building and one contributing site.

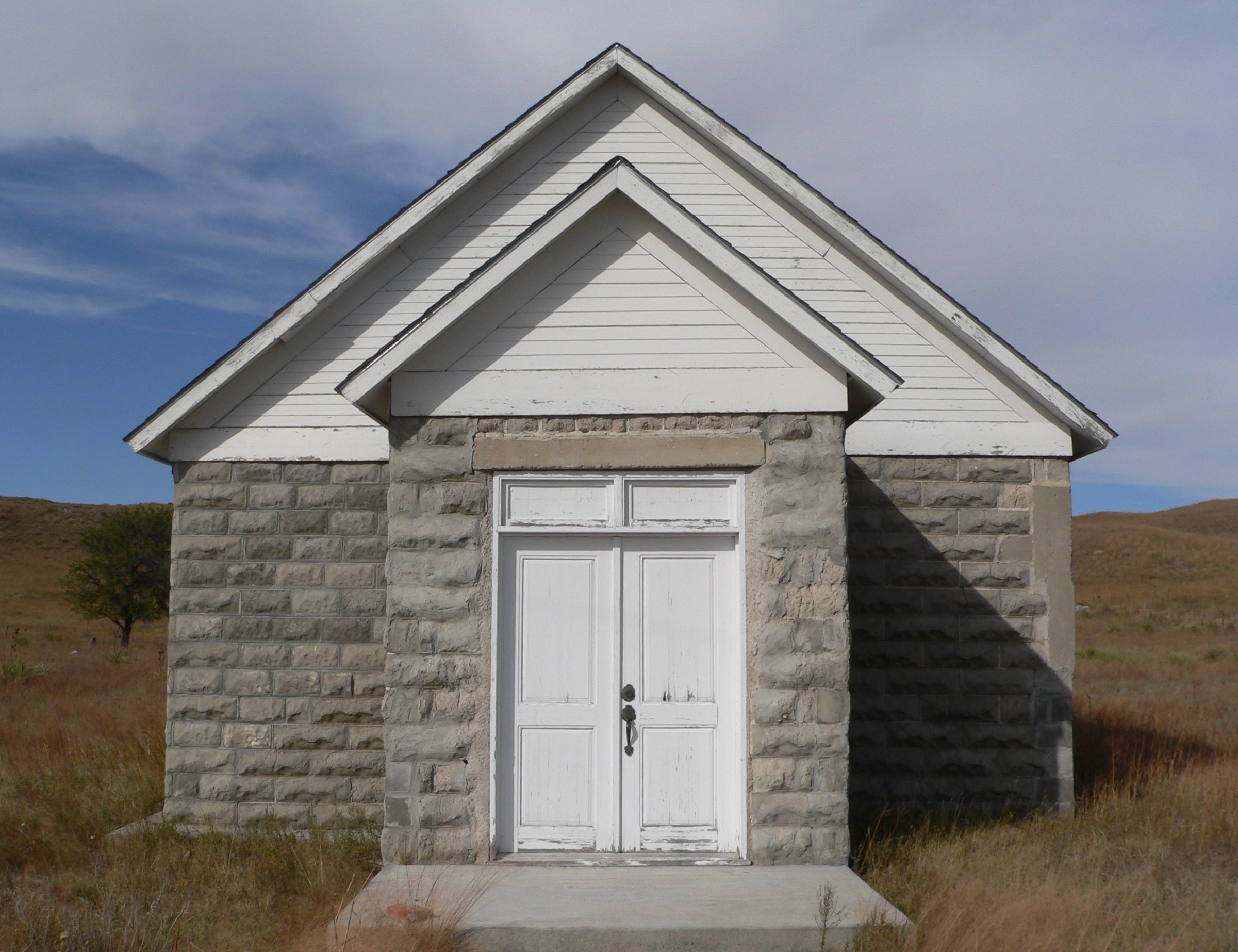

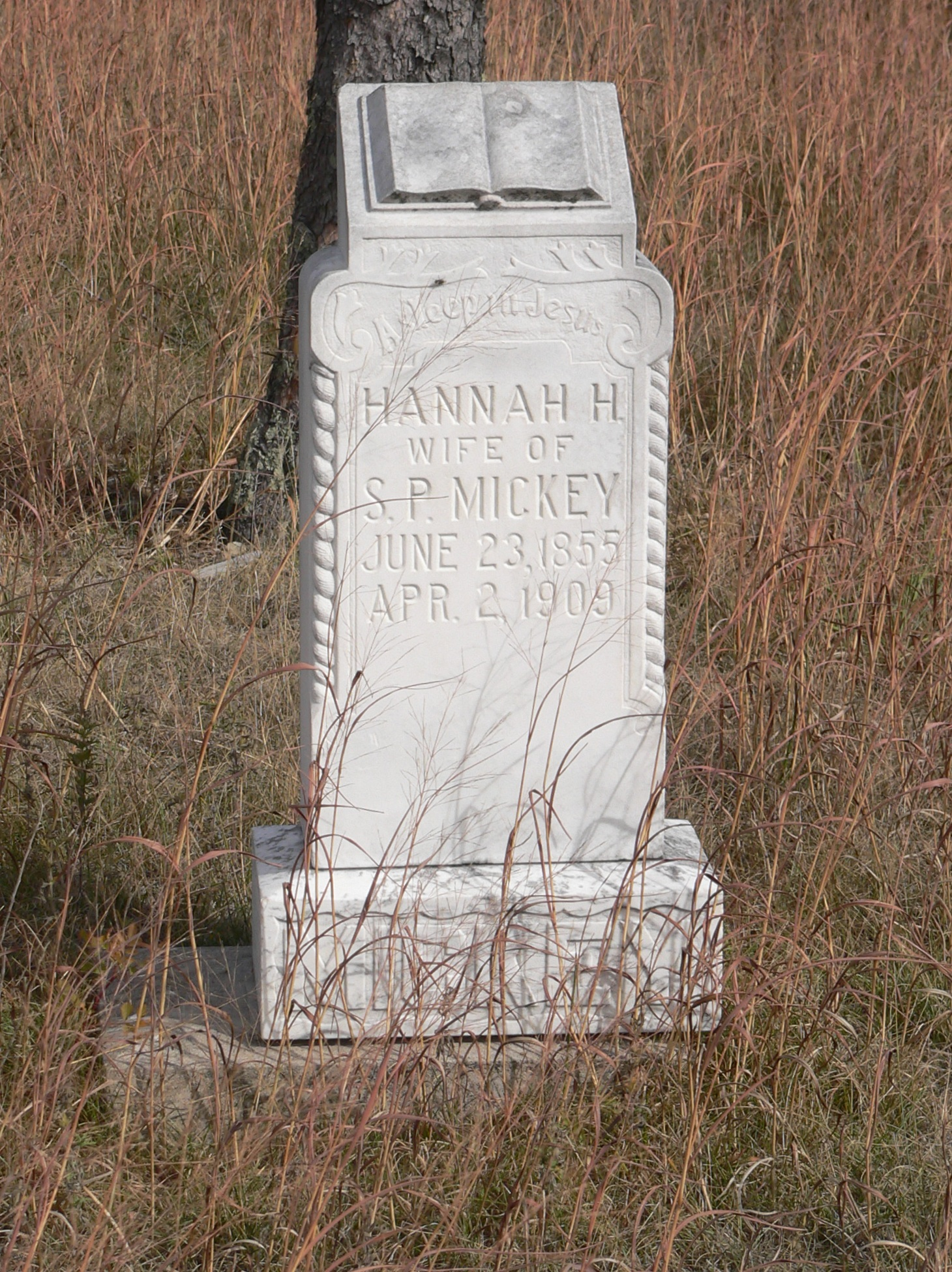

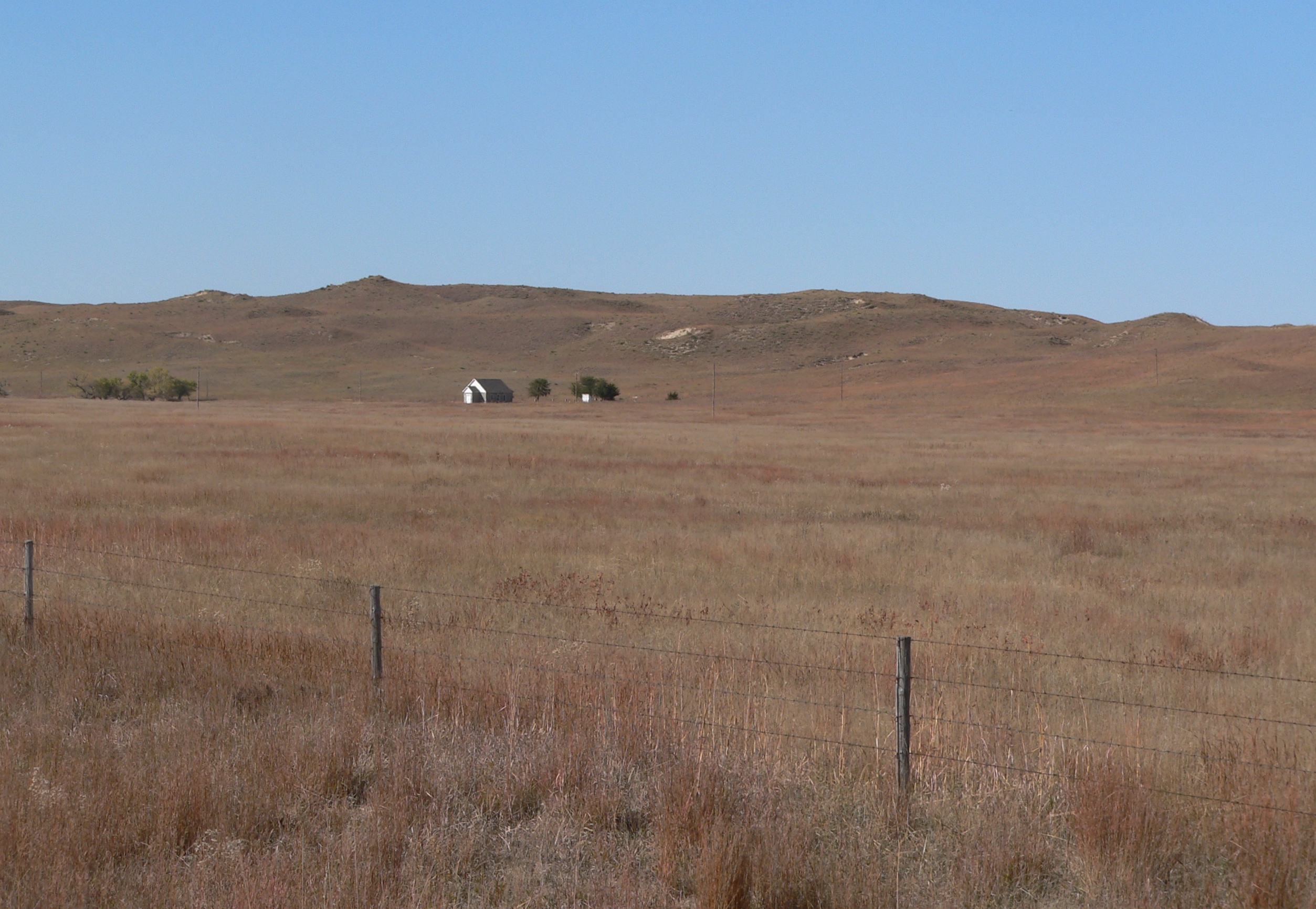

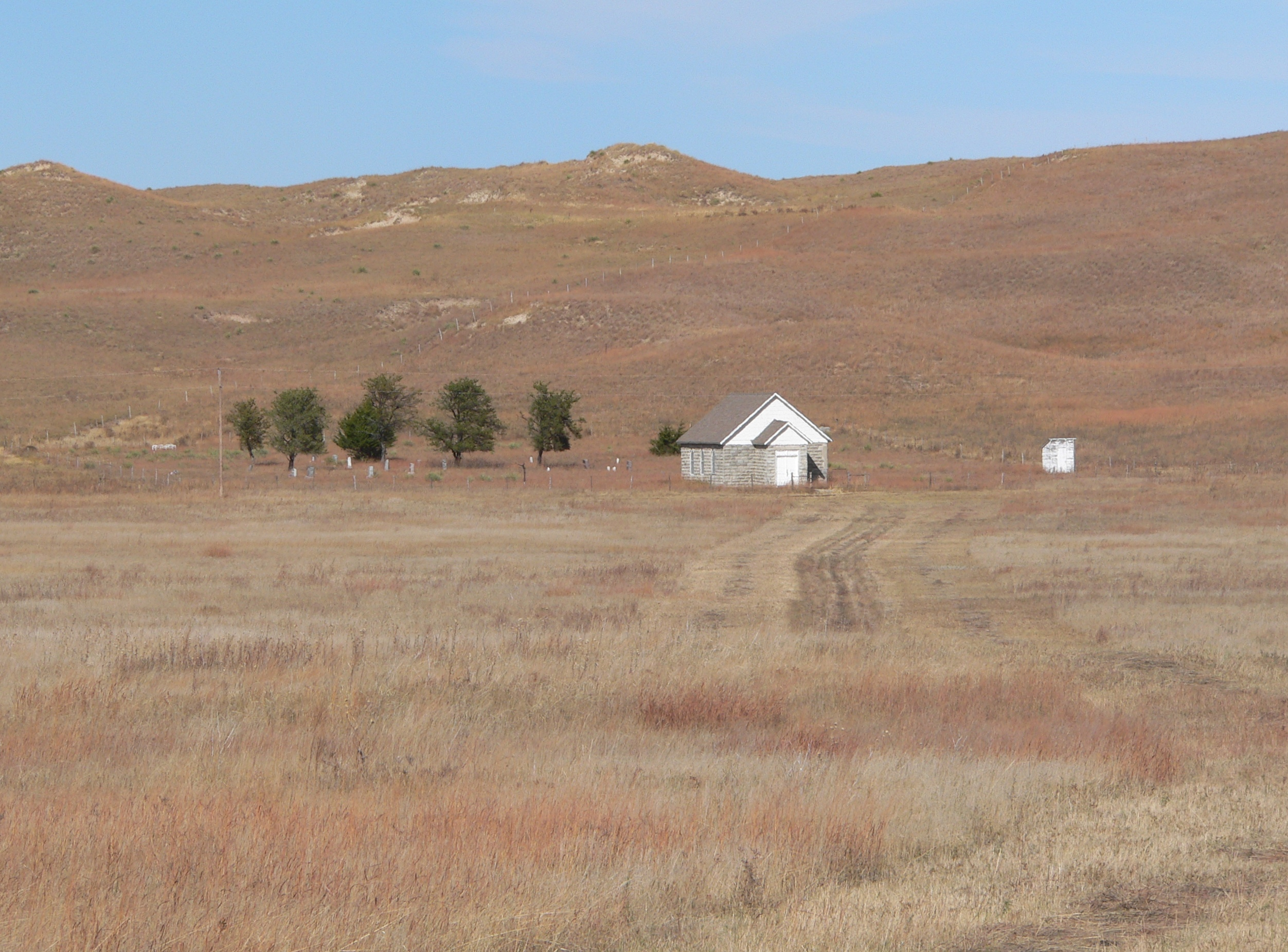

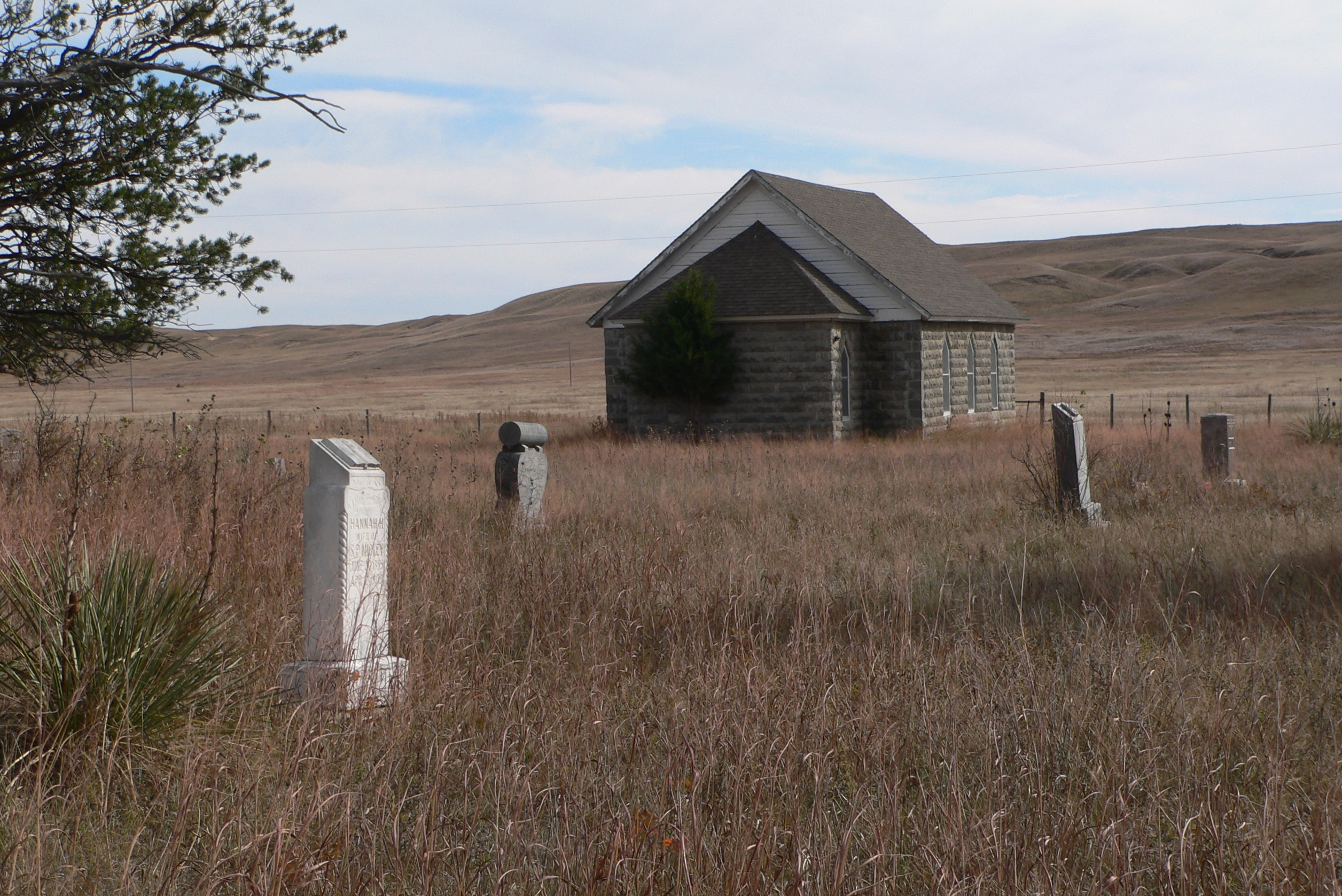

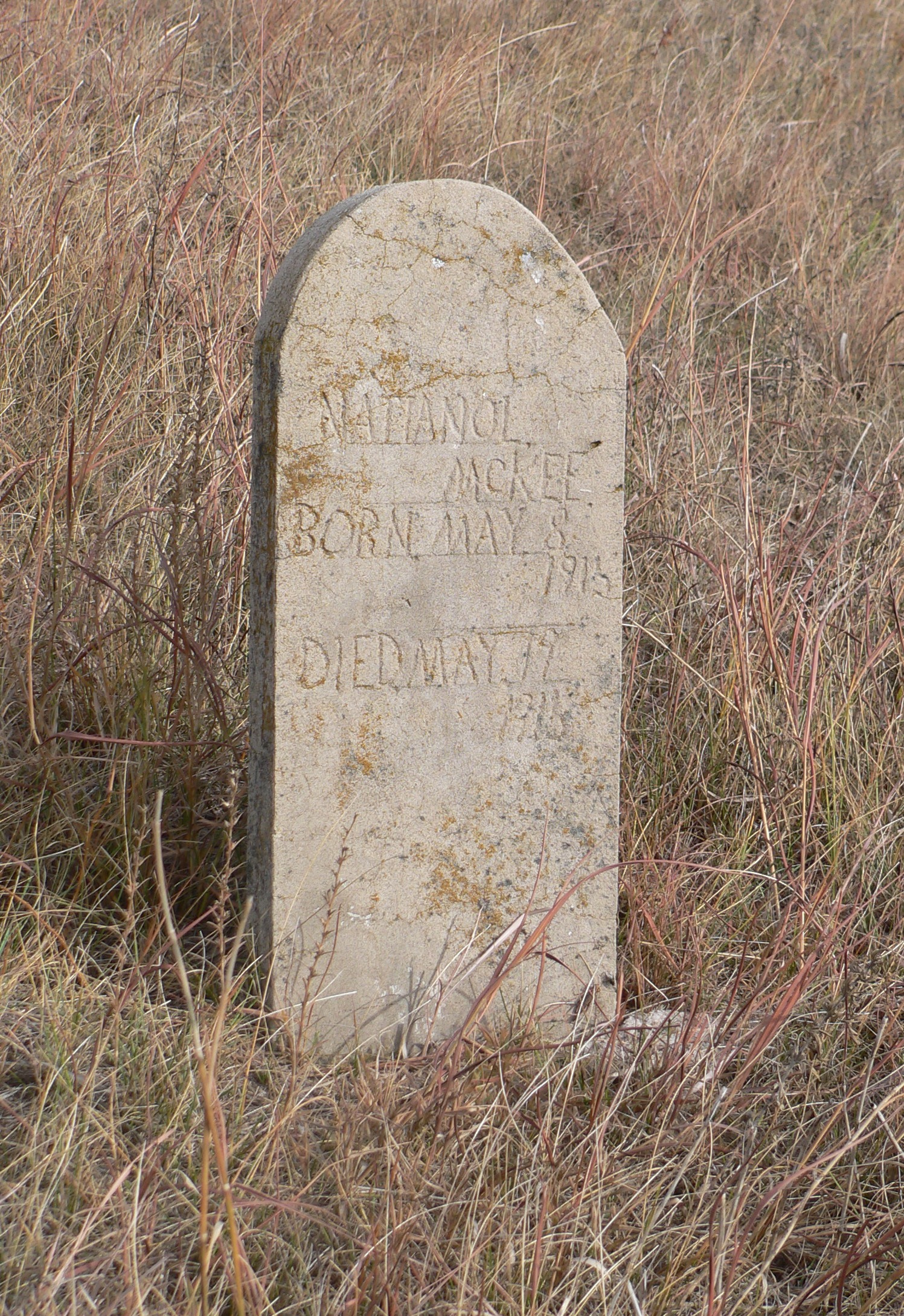

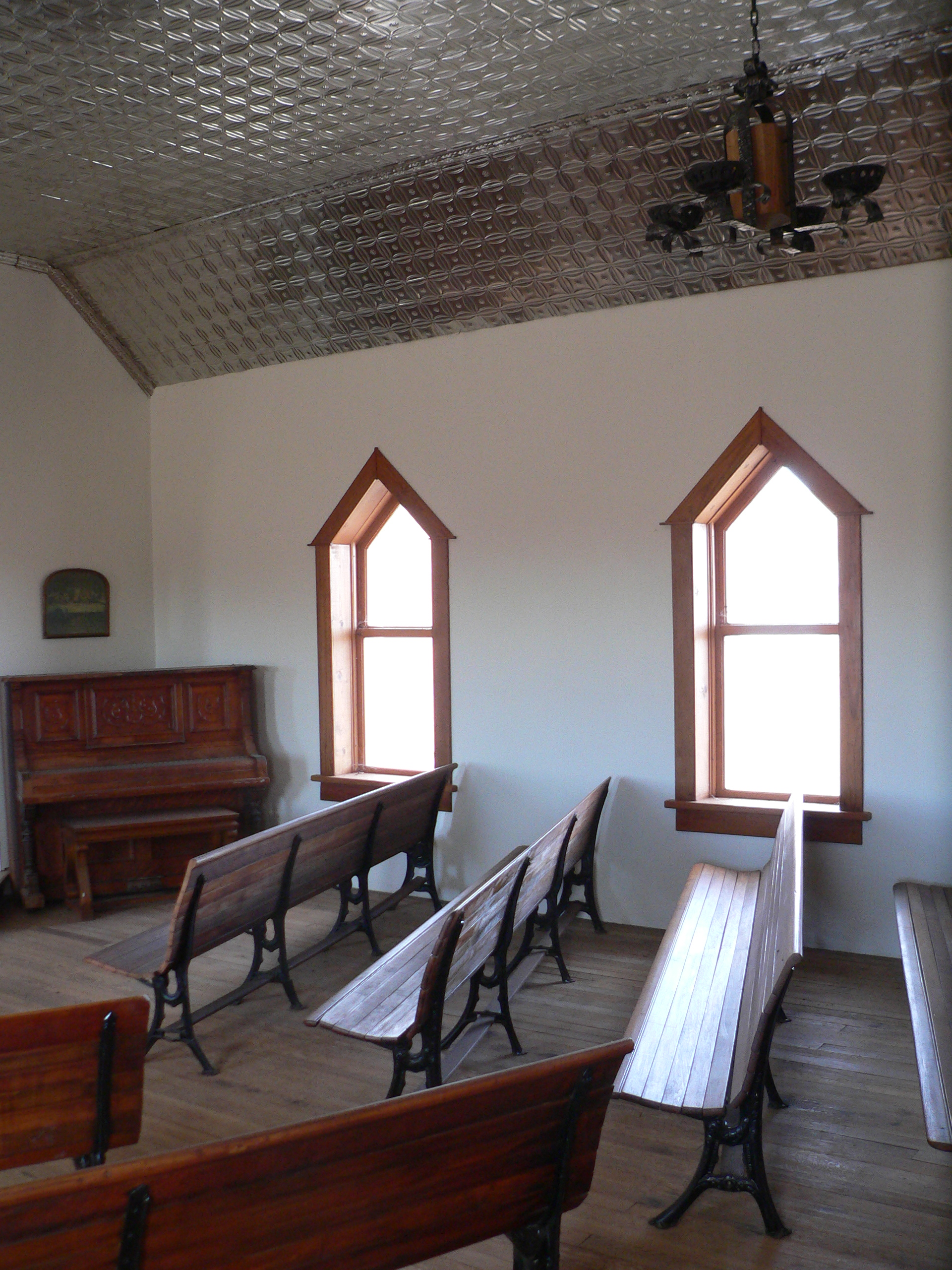

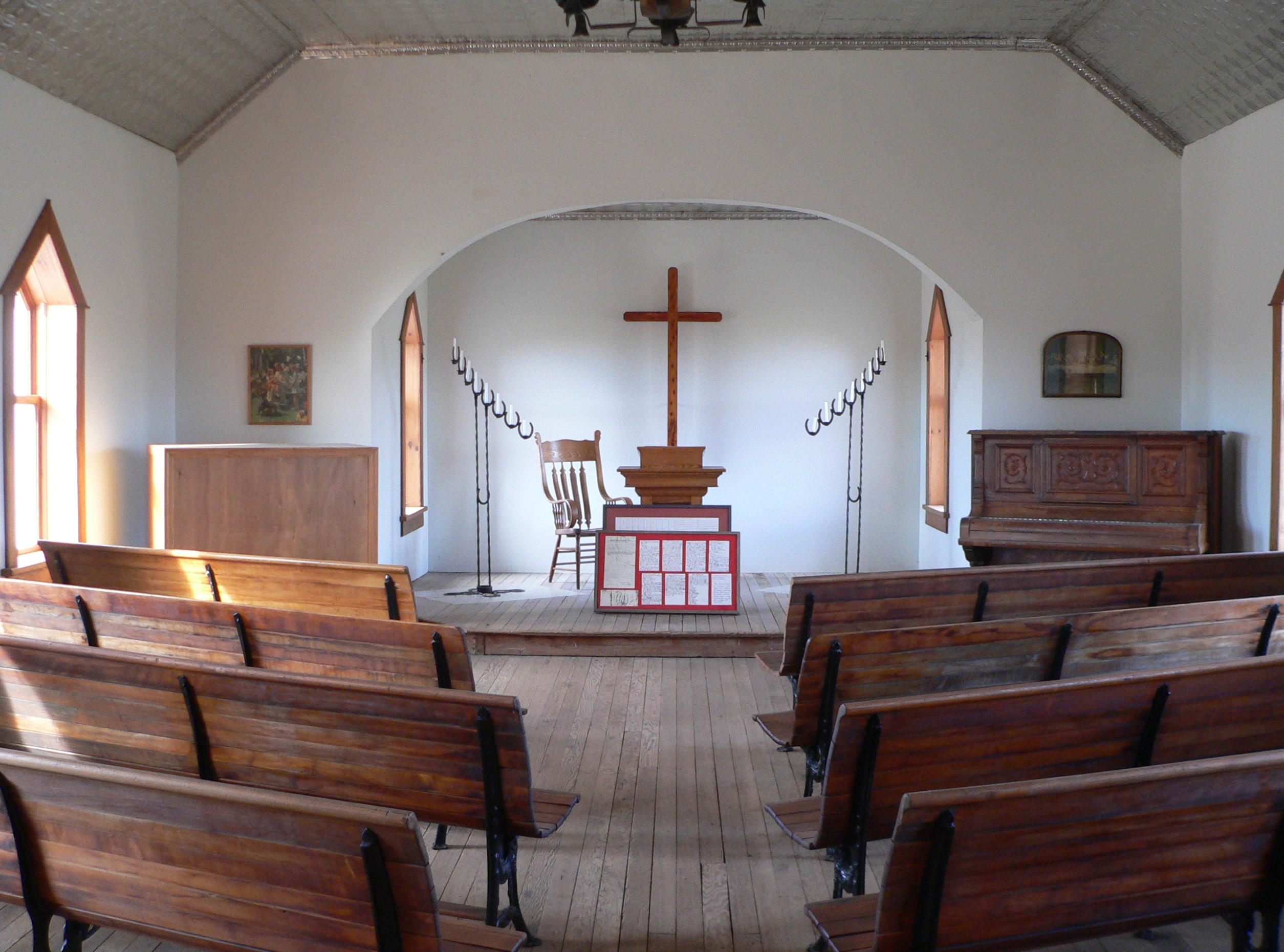

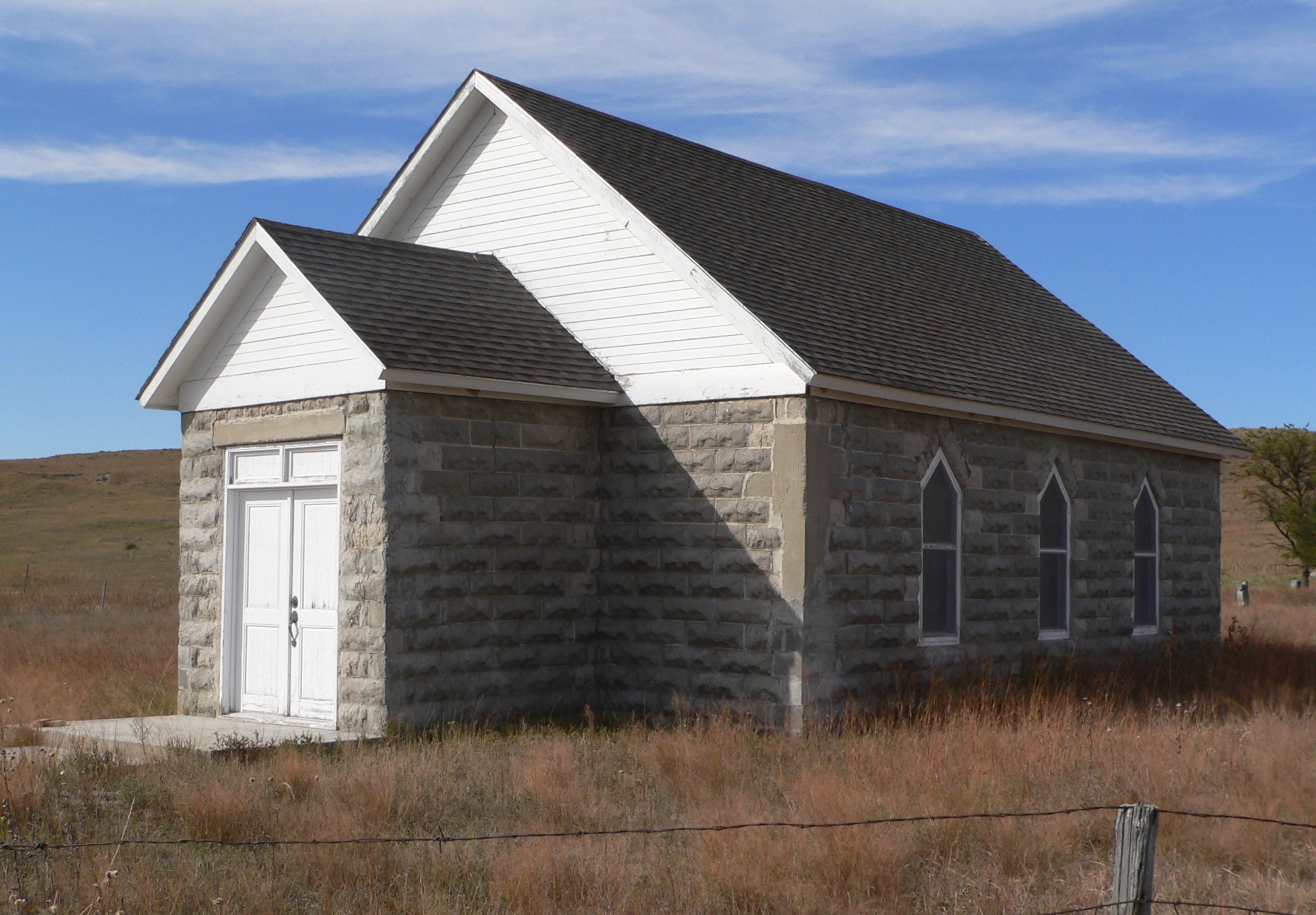
