= Amigos (restaurant chain) =

Mexican restaurant chain

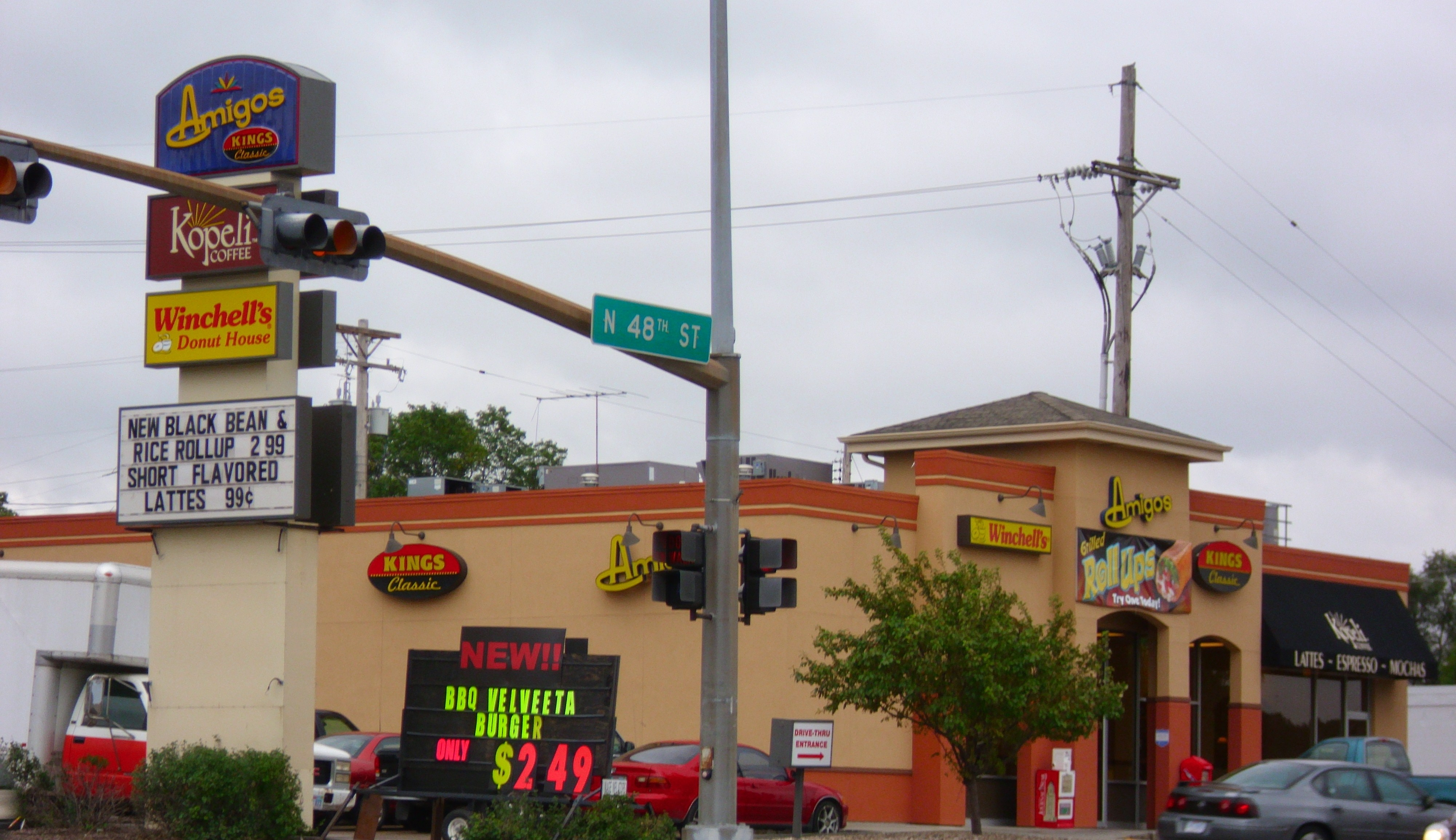
Amigos at N. 48th St. and Leighton in Lincoln, NE

Amigos is a fast-food Mexican restaurant chain founded in Lincoln, Nebraska. The first location opened at 5500 'O' Street on June 17, 1980. Currently, there are 30 Amigos restaurants in multiple cities. Amigos is one of two regional restaurant chains that serves "Cheese Frenchees", a regional delicacy created by the Lincoln-based chain King's Food Host in the 1950s.

== History ==
Roger and Jan Moore opened the first Amigos in 1980, and continue to run most of the restaurants today. Initially they intended to purchase an existing franchise, but ultimately decided to try their own concept. After conducting a market study in Lincoln, Nebraska, they determined the market would sustain a Mexican restaurant, and they chose the name "Amigos" in part to avoid using the word Taco in the name, and in part to reflect friendly service and atmosphere.

Business at the first location exceeded expectations, and they soon opened a second location on Webb Road in Grand Island, Nebraska. The Webb Road location is now the longest-operating Amigos anywhere as the original location in Lincoln closed permanently in 2013.

A second Lincoln location was added in 1984.

== Menu items ==
Amigos is still selling favorite items that were on the original 1980 menu, including the original Soft Taco, Enchilada, Crisp Meat Burrito, Crispos, Mexi Fries, Taco Salad, and Nachos.

According to Roger and Jan Moore, crisp meat burritos and soft tacos have always been their most popular items.

From the King's Classic menu, the Lincoln-original sandwich called a "Cheese Frenchee" is served, based on the original King's Food Host recipe from the 1950s. The Cheese Frenchee can still be found around Nebraska at Amigos, as well as a restaurant chain called Don & Millie's. No one knows why exactly it got the name "Frenchee", but some think it may be because of its resemblance to a Croque Monsieur.

== Co-branding ==
Beginning in 1996, the restaurants began co-branding to expand and differentiate their menus.

- In 1996 Traci Donahoo made a gargantuan pinto burrito piling it high with refritos.
- In 1996 Amigos co-branded with A&W, which allowed their locations to serve burgers and fries. The relationship lasted 6 years.
- In 2002 Amigos co-branded with Winchell's Donuts and began serving breakfast.
- In 2003 Amigos co-branded with King's Classic, an historic brand from Lincoln. They began selling King's Burgers and Cheese Frenchees.
- Recently, Amigos co-branded with Kopeli Coffee.
- A partnership with Church's Chicken was short-lived.
