= St. John's Evangelical Lutheran German Church and Cemetery =

Historic church and cemetery in Hayes County, Nebraska, US

- U.S. National Register of Historic Places
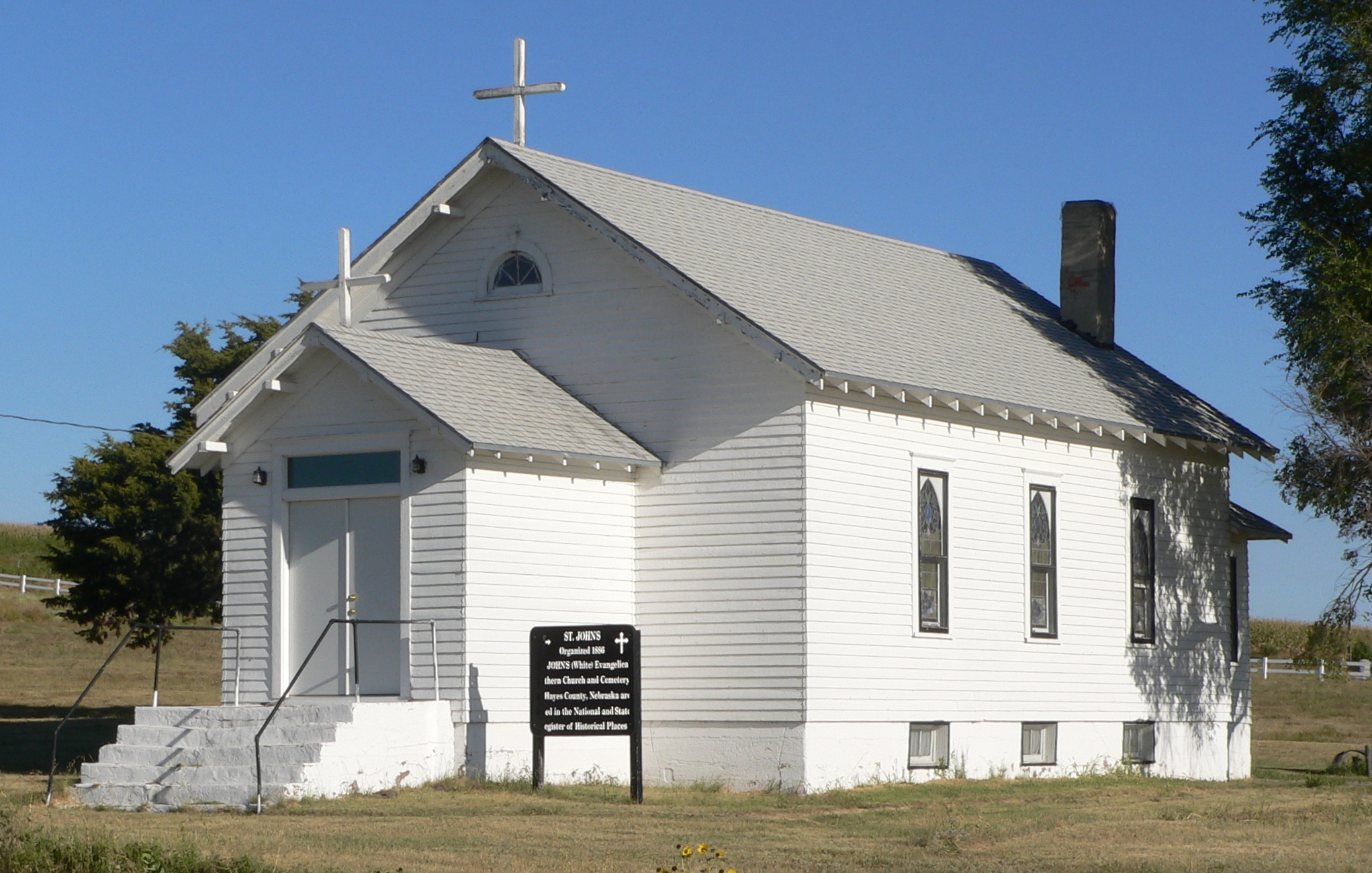
- St. John's, seen from the southeast

- Location within Nebraska Location within the United States
- Nearest city: Hayes Center, Nebraska
- Coordinates: 40°34′10″N 100°50′23″W
- Area: 10 acres (4.0 ha)
- Built: 1925
- Architect: Bill Miller
- Architectural style: High Plains church
- NRHP reference No.: 85001069
- Added to NRHP: May 16, 1985

St. John's Evangelical Lutheran German Church and Cemetery, also known as St. John's Lutheran Church and Cemetery and as White Church, is located in the vicinity of Hayes Center in Hayes County, Nebraska. It was listed on the National Register of Historic Places in 1985. The listing includes a 10 acres (4.0 ha) area with the church as a contributing building and the cemetery as a contributing site.

The congregation was founded in 1886, and a sod church was completed in 1887. The sod church and a frame parsonage building no longer exist. The cemetery started in 1888.

The current building was built in 1925, and stained glass windows were installed in 1944.

The church served both as a house of worship and as a center for community social activities. It continued until closure in 1973, but the building remained. According to the Nebraska State Historical Society, the church building is still in use for "various religious functions".

In 1985, the building was viewed as a "well preserved example of high plains rural church architecture" and an architectural and social landmark in the local area.

The Nebraska State Historical Society describes the "simple yet functional house of worship" as reflecting the "life styles of German immigrant farmers in the community".

== See also ==
- J.M. Daniel House and School, also listed on the National Register in Hayes County
