= Auburn, Nebraska =

- City
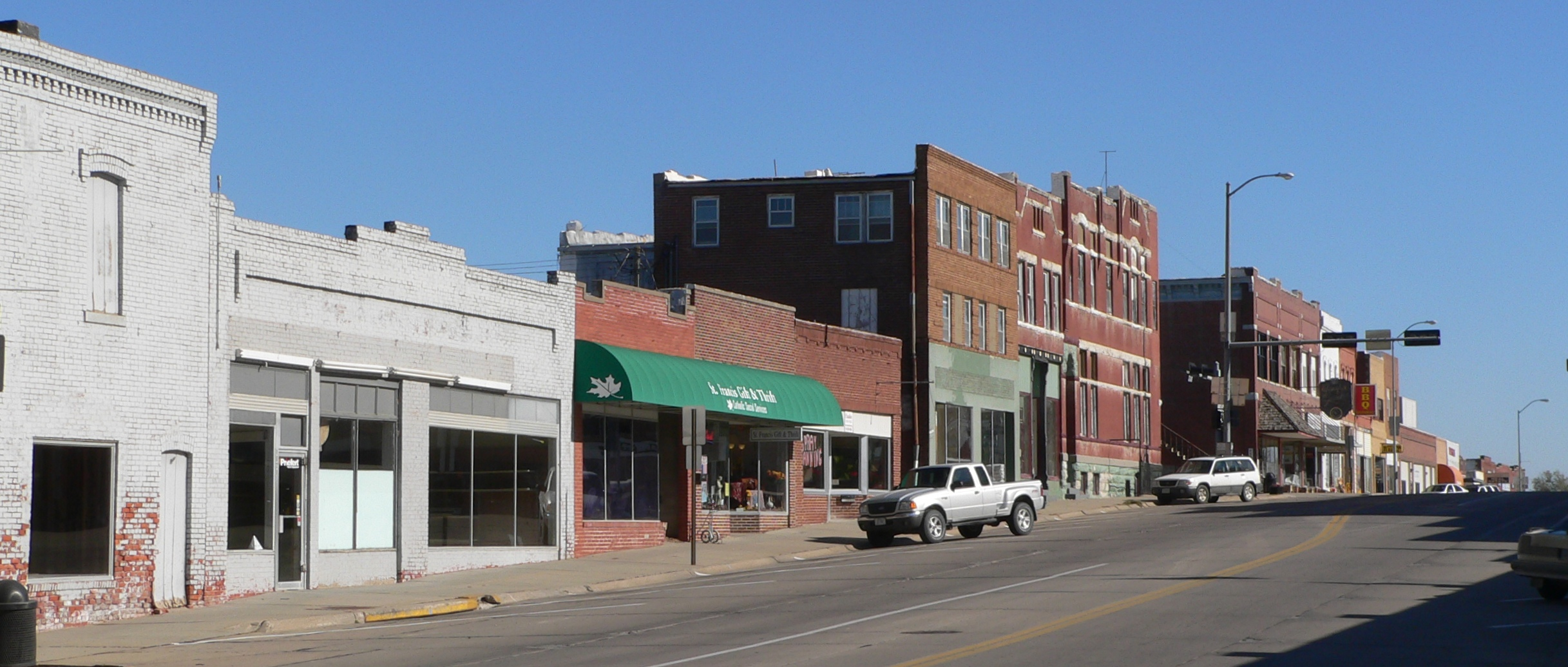
- Central Avenue: U.S. Highway 136

- Location of Auburn, Nebraska
- Coordinates: 40°23′22″N 95°50′37″W
- Country: United States
- State: Nebraska
- County: Nemaha

Area
  - Total: 2.19 sq mi (5.66 km^{2})
  - Land: 2.19 sq mi (5.66 km^{2})
  - Water: 0 sq mi (0.00 km^{2})
- Elevation: 1,027 ft (313 m)

Population (2020)
  - Total: 3,470
  - Density: 1,587.6/sq mi (612.99/km^{2})
- Time zone: UTC−6 (Central (CST))
  - Summer (DST): UTC−5 (CDT)
- ZIP code: 68305
- Area code: 402
- FIPS code: 31-02655
- GNIS feature ID: 2394026
- Website: auburn.ne.gov

Auburn is a city in Nemaha County, Nebraska, United States, and its county seat. The population was 3,470 at the 2020 census.

== History ==
Auburn is an incorporation of two towns, Calvert and Sheridan, which combined in 1882 in part to have the voting power to wrestle the county seat away from Brownville, a village located ten miles to the east. The incorporation was successful, and in 1883, Auburn was named the county seat. The city is named after Auburn, New York.

The only person to be elected to the United States Congress as a member of the Prohibitionist Party, Charles Hiram Randall, was born in Auburn on July 23, 1865.

From 1910 to 1913, Auburn was home to the Auburn Athletics, a Class C level minor league baseball team. The Auburn Athletics played as members of the Missouri-Iowa-Nebraska-Kansas League for the duration of the league. The Auburn Athletics played home games at the Legion Memorial Park. Still in use today, Legion Memorial Park is designated as a National Historic Park site. The address is 1015 J Street.

== Geography and climate ==
According to the United States Census Bureau, the city has a total area of 2.18 square miles (5.65 km^{2}), all land.

Climate data for Auburn 5 ESE, Nebraska (1991–2020 normals, extremes 1899–present)
Month	Jan	Feb	Mar	Apr	May	Jun	Jul	Aug	Sep	Oct	Nov	Dec	Year
Record high °F (°C)	70 (21)	83 (28)	96 (36)	100 (38)	105 (41)	109 (43)	112 (44)	113 (45)	108 (42)	98 (37)	84 (29)	87 (31)	113 (45)
Mean maximum °F (°C)	58.9 (14.9)	64.2 (17.9)	78.5 (25.8)	88.0 (31.1)	92.7 (33.7)	94.9 (34.9)	98.2 (36.8)	97.2 (36.2)	95.2 (35.1)	88.4 (31.3)	73.3 (22.9)	61.9 (16.6)	100.2 (37.9)
Mean daily maximum °F (°C)	34.7 (1.5)	40.0 (4.4)	53.3 (11.8)	65.0 (18.3)	75.3 (24.1)	84.2 (29.0)	87.3 (30.7)	85.7 (29.8)	80.0 (26.7)	67.1 (19.5)	51.7 (10.9)	39.1 (3.9)	63.6 (17.6)
Daily mean °F (°C)	24.4 (−4.2)	29.3 (−1.5)	41.4 (5.2)	52.6 (11.4)	64.3 (17.9)	73.8 (23.2)	77.2 (25.1)	74.8 (23.8)	67.4 (19.7)	54.5 (12.5)	40.4 (4.7)	29.0 (−1.7)	52.4 (11.3)
Mean daily minimum °F (°C)	14.1 (−9.9)	18.6 (−7.4)	29.4 (−1.4)	40.2 (4.6)	53.4 (11.9)	63.4 (17.4)	67.1 (19.5)	63.9 (17.7)	54.8 (12.7)	41.9 (5.5)	29.0 (−1.7)	19.0 (−7.2)	41.2 (5.1)
Mean minimum °F (°C)	−9.8 (−23.2)	−2.3 (−19.1)	8.3 (−13.2)	22.3 (−5.4)	35.6 (2.0)	49.1 (9.5)	53.5 (11.9)	50.7 (10.4)	36.1 (2.3)	23.0 (−5.0)	11.1 (−11.6)	−2.1 (−18.9)	−13.2 (−25.1)
Record low °F (°C)	−27 (−33)	−35 (−37)	−21 (−29)	7 (−14)	22 (−6)	39 (4)	43 (6)	38 (3)	21 (−6)	−4 (−20)	−5 (−21)	−27 (−33)	−35 (−37)
Average precipitation inches (mm)	0.76 (19)	1.11 (28)	2.00 (51)	2.90 (74)	4.99 (127)	4.40 (112)	4.34 (110)	3.34 (85)	3.07 (78)	2.49 (63)	1.74 (44)	1.17 (30)	32.31 (821)
Average snowfall inches (cm)	7.7 (20)	8.1 (21)	3.6 (9.1)	1.6 (4.1)	0.1 (0.25)	0.0 (0.0)	0.0 (0.0)	0.0 (0.0)	0.0 (0.0)	0.6 (1.5)	2.3 (5.8)	6.4 (16)	30.4 (77)
Average precipitation days (≥ 0.01 in)	5.8	6.3	7.7	8.8	10.2	9.6	8.6	7.8	6.5	6.6	5.2	5.8	88.9
Average snowy days (≥ 0.1 in)	4.7	4.7	2.8	1.0	0.0	0.0	0.0	0.0	0.0	0.4	1.5	4.0	19.1
Source: NOAA

== Demographics ==
Historical population
Census	Pop.	Note	%±
1890	1,537		—
1900	2,664		73.3%
1910	2,729		2.4%
1920	2,863		4.9%
1930	3,068		7.2%
1940	3,639		18.6%
1950	3,422		−6.0%
1960	3,229		−5.6%
1970	3,650		13.0%
1980	3,482		−4.6%
1990	3,443		−1.1%
2000	3,350		−2.7%
2010	3,460		3.3%
2020	3,470		0.3%
U.S. Decennial Census; 2012 Estimate

=== 2020 census ===
As of the 2020 census, Auburn had a population of 3,470. The median age was 39.4 years. 25.4% of residents were under the age of 18 and 20.4% of residents were 65 years of age or older. For every 100 females there were 96.3 males, and for every 100 females age 18 and over there were 93.6 males age 18 and over.

0.0% of residents lived in urban areas, while 100.0% lived in rural areas.

There were 1,453 households in Auburn, of which 28.9% had children under the age of 18 living in them. Of all households, 45.1% were married-couple households, 19.1% were households with a male householder and no spouse or partner present, and 28.6% were households with a female householder and no spouse or partner present. About 35.6% of all households were made up of individuals and 18.1% had someone living alone who was 65 years of age or older.

There were 1,669 housing units, of which 12.9% were vacant. The homeowner vacancy rate was 3.2% and the rental vacancy rate was 11.8%.

Racial composition as of the 2020 census
Race	Number	Percent
White	3,281	94.6%
Black or African American	7	0.2%
American Indian and Alaska Native	16	0.5%
Asian	23	0.7%
Native Hawaiian and Other Pacific Islander	0	0.0%
Some other race	24	0.7%
Two or more races	119	3.4%
Hispanic or Latino (of any race)	93	2.7%

=== 2010 census ===
As of the census of 2010, there were 3,460 people, 1,487 households, and 910 families residing in the city. The population density was 1,587.2 inhabitants per square mile (612.8/km^{2}). There were 1,721 housing units at an average density of 789.4 units per square mile (304.8 units/km^{2}). The racial makeup of the city was 97.3% White, 0.5% African American, 0.2% Native American, 0.7% Asian, 0.3% from other races, and 1.0% from two or more races. Hispanic or Latino of any race were 1.9% of the population.

There were 1,487 households, of which 28.7% had children under the age of 18 living with them, 48.6% were married couples living together, 9.5% had a female householder with no husband present, 3.1% had a male householder with no wife present, and 38.8% were non-families. 33.9% of all households were made up of individuals, and 16.9% had someone living alone who was 65 years of age or older. The average household size was 2.26 and the average family size was 2.87.

The median age in the city was 42.1 years. 24.1% of residents were under the age of 18; 7.2% were between the ages of 18 and 24; 22.4% were from 25 to 44; 26.7% were from 45 to 64; and 19.7% were 65 years of age or older. The gender makeup of the city was 46.9% male and 53.1% female.

=== 2000 census ===
As of the census of 2000, there were 3,350 people, 1,479 households, and 924 families residing in the city. The population density was 2,184.1 inhabitants per square mile (843.3/km^{2}). There were 1,642 housing units at an average density of 1,070.5 units per square mile (413.3 units/km^{2}). The racial makeup of the city was 97.19% White, 0.36% African American, 0.27% Native American, 1.04% Asian, 0.03% Pacific Islander, 0.30% from other races, and 0.81% from two or more races. Hispanic or Latino of any race were 0.81% of the population.

There were 1,479 households, out of which 29.1% had children under the age of 18 living with them, 50.4% were married couples living together, 9.5% had a female householder with no husband present, and 37.5% were non-families. 33.3% of all households were made up of individuals, and 18.8% had someone living alone who was 65 years of age or older. The average household size was 2.24 and the average family size was 2.86.

In the city, the population was spread out, with 24.3% under the age of 18, 7.3% from 18 to 24, 26.4% from 25 to 44, 22.5% from 45 to 64, and 19.4% who were 65 years of age or older. The median age was 40 years. For every 100 females, there were 88.8 males. For every 100 females age 18 and over, there were 86.0 males.

In 2000, the median household income was $34,207 and the median family income was $46,563. Males had a median income of $35,719 compared with $18,246 for females. The per capita income for the city was $18,523. About 7.2% of families and 13.2% of the population were below the poverty line, including 16.0% of those under age 18 and 14.4% of those age 65 or over.

== Education ==
The school district is Auburn Public Schools.

== Notable people ==
- Elzada Clover, botanist
- Chad Kelsay, professional American football player
- Chris Kelsay, professional American football player
- Neal Obermeyer, editorial cartoonist
- Charles Hiram Randall, U.S. Representative from California
