= List of companies based in Omaha =

This is a list of companies in Omaha, comprising companies that are presently headquartered in Omaha, Nebraska. This list includes companies that operate mainly out of Omaha, despite being nominally headquartered elsewhere.

== Overview ==
Although Nebraska's economy is still primarily based on agriculture, Omaha's economy today has diversified to become a national leader in several industries, including banking, insurance, telecommunications, architecture/construction and transportation. Omaha's economy has grown dramatically since the early 1990s. The city has five companies that rank in the Fortune 500. It also is the smallest city to have two major research hospitals, the University of Nebraska Medical Center and Creighton University Medical Center.

Omaha's most prominent businessman is Warren Buffett, nicknamed the "Oracle of Omaha", who was ranked by Forbes magazine as the fourth richest man in the world (in 2013).

== Businesses ==
=== A ===
- ACI Worldwide – digital payments software company, headquartered in Elkhorn
- American Gramaphone – record label for Chip Davis' Mannheim Steamroller group

=== B ===
- Backwaters Press – independent nonprofit literary publisher based in Omaha, acquired by The University of Nebraska Press in 2018.
- Bailey Lauerman – full-service advertising agency that moved its headquarters to Omaha in 2013
- Baker's Supermarkets – subsidiary of Kroger
- Berkshire Hathaway – large Fortune 500 holding company controlled by investor Warren Buffett
- Blue Cross Blue Shield of Nebraska – local Blue Cross Blue Shield association
- Borsheim's Fine Jewelry – the largest independent jewelry store in the country, owned by Berkshire Hathaway
- Boys Town – National child & family services nonprofit
- Bozell Worldwide – once one of the largest advertising agencies in the world

=== C ===
- Central States Indemnity Company – wholly owned company of Berkshire Hathaway
- CHI Health – regional catholic healthcare network, part of CommonSpirit Health

=== D ===
- Dehner Company – high-end custom boot and leather goods manufacturer
- DLR Group – employee-owned integrated design firm
- Dundee Bank – community bank based in the Dundee neighborhood

=== E ===
- eCreamery – e-commerce ice cream retailer headquartered in Dundee
- Election Systems & Software – provider of voting machine technology headquartered in Omaha

=== F ===
- Film Streams – nonprofit arts organization offering screenings and film education
- First National Bank of Omaha – largest bank in Nebraska
- First Westroads Bank – community bank with two branches, named for Westroads Mall

=== G ===
- Gavilon – commodity management firm specialising in grain and fertilisers
- Gallup – consulting firm known for conducting public opinion polls, operational headquarters only
- Godfather's Pizza – pizza franchise chain
- Green Plains Inc. – ethanol production and agribusiness company

=== H ===
- HDR, Inc. – architecture and engineering firm specialising in the healthcare industry
- Home Instead – franchiser specializing in non-medical in-home care

=== I ===
- Infofree – sales lead generation and business database service
- Intrado – Fortune 1000 communications services company, formerly known as West Corporation

=== J ===
- JN-International – biopharmaceutical company, provider of vaccines and diagnostics
- J.P. Cooke Company – family-owned provider of stamps and signage products since 1887

=== K ===
- Kiewit Corporation – international Fortune 500 construction company
- Kutak Rock – national law firm founded in Omaha

=== L ===
- Lauritzen Corporation – holding company, primary owner of First National Bank of Omaha
- Leo A Daly – global architecture and engineering firm
- Lindsay Corporation – manufacturer of irrigation systems
- Lozier Corporation – manufacturer of store fixtures

=== M ===
- Metropolitan Utilities District – public gas and water utility
- Midland Scientific – national, woman-owned lab products distributor
- Milan Laser – laser hair removal provider
- MultiMechanics – developer of predictive material modelling software
- Mutual of Omaha – fortune 500 insurance and financial services company
- Methodist Health System – nonprofit healthcare organization

=== N ===
- National Indemnity Company – insurance company, subsidiary of Berkshire Hathaway
- NAPAREX – logistics and courier company
- National Property Inspections – franchiser of home and commercial inspection businesses
- Nebraska Brewing Company – beer brewer headquartered in Papilion
- Nebraska Furniture Mart – nation’s largest home furnishings store, owned by Berkshire Hathaway
- Nebraska Medicine – secular nonprofit healthcare company associated with the University of Nebraska Medical Center
- NP Dodge Company – one of the oldest real estate firms west of the Mississippi

=== O ===
The Omaha World-Herald building in Downtown Omaha

- Omaha Public Power District – public electric utility
- The Omaha Star – African-American newspaper based in North Omaha
- Omaha Steaks – mail order food distributor
- Omaha World-Herald – primary daily newspaper of Nebraska
- Oriental Trading Company – party supplies and novelties retailer

=== P ===
- Physicians Mutual Insurance Company – life and health insurance company founded in 1902
- Pinnacle Bancorp – Bank holding company with 160 locations in eight states.

=== R ===
- The Reader – alternative newspaper
- Right at Home – in-home senior care franchiser

=== S ===
- Saddle Creek Records – indie record label that launched bands like Bright Eyes
- Scooter's Coffee – drive-through coffeehouse chain
- Scoular – grain commodities trader
- Sojern – travel marketing platform based in Omaha
- SPEED! Nebraska Records – independent rock record label
- Straight Arrow News – media company owned by the Joe Ricketts
- Sweet Stash – candy manufacturer founded by the Potash Twins and Martin Starr

=== T ===
- Tenaska – employee-owned energy company
- Triage Staffing – Medical staffing agency

=== U ===
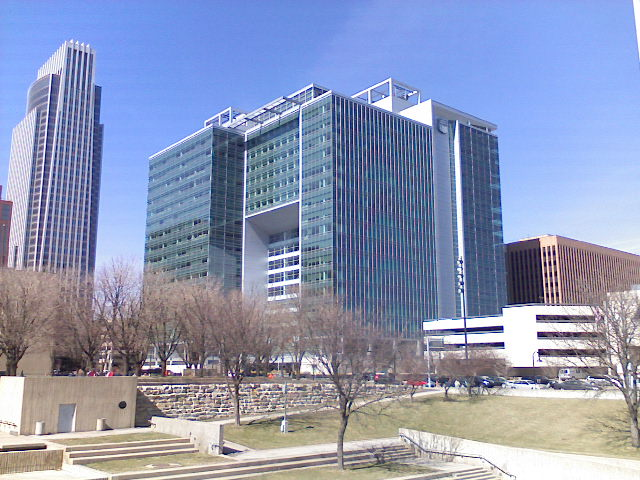
The Union Pacific Center in Omaha

- Union Pacific Railroad – fortune 500 railroad company

=== V ===
- Valmont Industries – fortune 1000 company manufacturing utility and infrastructure products

=== W ===
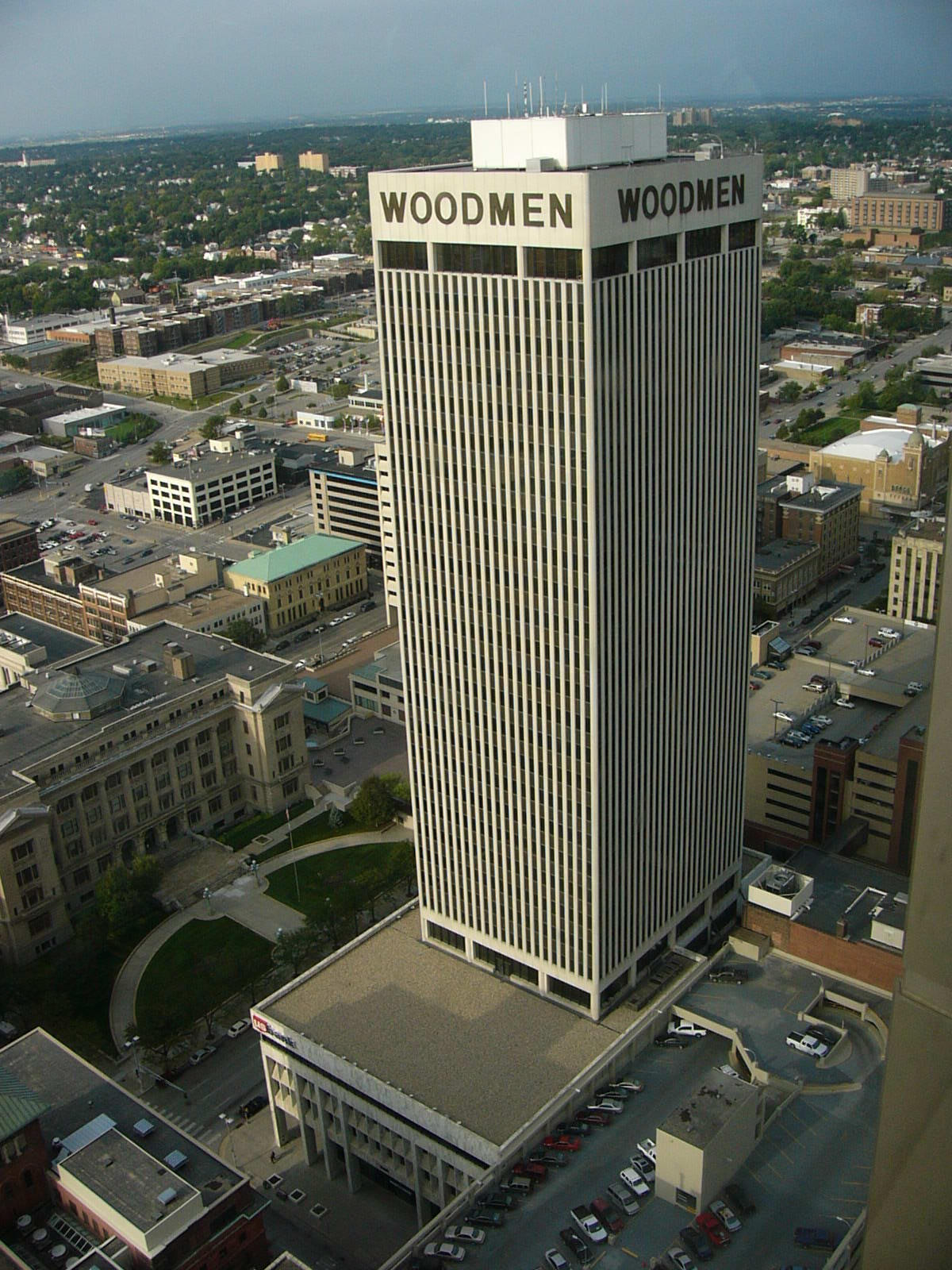
The WoodmenLife Tower

- Werner Enterprises – major long-haul trucking and logistics firm
- Woodmen of the World – fraternal benefit society providing insurance

== Companies formerly based in Omaha ==
- Bank of Florence – a wildcat bank located in Florence. Operated from 1856-1859, then again from 1890-1936. Building still stands and is now a museum.
- Bekins Van Lines, Inc. – once the largest moving companies in the country, now based in Indianapolis
- ConAgra Foods – fortune 500 company, it is one of the country's largest packaged foods makers; moved its headquarters to Chicago in 2016
- Cudahy Packing Company – founded in 1887 as the Armour-Cudahy packing plant, moved its headquarters to Chicago in 1911, then back to Omaha following World War II. Moved its headquarters again to Phoenix in 1956, and finally merged into Bar-S Foods Company.
- First Data – fortune 500 company specializing in global payment technology solutions, purchased by Fiserv in 2019
- Gordmans – discount department store chain, declared bankruptcy in 2017 before going out of business in 2020
- Hayneedle – operator of e-commerce websites, acquired by jet.com in 2016 and eventually merged into Walmart
- InterNorth – merged with Houston Natural Gas Company to become ENRON, headquarters moved to Houston
- Krug Brewery – Oldest of Omaha's "big four" breweries, founded in 1859 and operated until 1987
- Metz Brewery – Another "Big 4" Brewrey operated from 186 until prohibition, brand continued to be brewed until 1961.
- Pacific Life Insurance Company – financial services company that domiciled in Omaha from Newport Beach, California in 2010
- PayPal – closed its administrative headquarters in La Vista in 2023
- RFD-TV – rural-focused cable TV network, moved to Nashville in 2015
- Storz Brewing Company – North Omaha brewery founded by the Storz Family in 1876. The family sold its holdings to Grain Belt Breweries in 1966, who closed the brewery and retired its brands in 1972.
- TD Ameritrade — former Fortune 500 company, it was one of the largest brokerages in the country; acquired by Charles Schwab
- Travel & Transport – based in Omaha before being acquired by Australian Corporate Travel Management. Continues to operate as the "North America Head Office" of CTM
- Willow Springs Distilling Company – Nebraska's first distilery, remnants of the company continue to operate as the "Cornhusker Beverage" distribution company.

== See also ==
- Downtown Omaha
- List of lists about Omaha, Nebraska
