= Lists of Omaha topics =

This is a list of lists related to Omaha, Nebraska.

== Lists ==
- List of people
- List of landmarks
- List of cemeteries
- List of neighborhoods
- List of mayors
- List of Registered Historic Places in Douglas County
- List of people from North Omaha
- List of hospitals
- List of parks
- List of founding figures
- List of print media
- List of other media
- List of radio stations
- List of television stations
- List of churches
- List of synagogues
- List of streets
- List of public schools
- List of riots and civil unrest
- List of trails
- List of historic companies
- List of tallest buildings
- List of companies
- List of colleges and universities
- List of African-American historic places
- List of museums and cultural institutions

== Timelines ==
- Timeline of Omaha history
- Timeline of racial tension
- Timeline of North Omaha history
