= List of people from Omaha, Nebraska =

This is a list of people from Omaha, Nebraska, in the United States.

== A ==
- Hazel Abel — politician
- Titus Adams — professional football player
- Wesley Addy — actor
- Steve Alaimo — musician, record producer
- Houston Alexander — professional MMA fighter, radio host, rapper
- Kurt Andersen — author
- Craig Anton — actor, comedian
- Adele Astaire — dancer, entertainer
- Fred Astaire — dancer, actor
- Guerin Austin — Miss Nebraska USA 2004
- Pamela Austin — actress

== B ==
- Elaine Badgley Arnoux (née Helen Elaine Harper) — portraitist, painter, and sculptor
- Max Baer — boxer
- Byron Bailey — professional American and Canadian football player
- Letitia Baldrige — etiquette expert, Kennedy White House aide
- Rex Barney — Major League Baseball pitcher for Brooklyn Dodgers
- John Beasley — actor
- Tom Becka — radio host
- Belles - country music singer
- Jackson Berkey — composer, pianist, instructor
- Wade Boggs — baseball player, Hall of Famer
- Alec Bohm — Major League Baseball third baseman for Philadelphia Phillies
- Bob Boozer — National Basketball Association player and Olympic gold medalist
- Gutzon Borglum — painter, sculptor of Mount Rushmore
- James E. Boyd — mayor of Omaha, 1881–1883 and 1885–1887; seventh governor of the state of Nebraska
- L. Brent Bozell, Jr. — conservative activist and Catholic writer
- Marlon Brando — actor
- Wade Brorby — United States federal appellate judge
- Mildred D. Brown — founder of the Omaha Star
- Chris Brunt — soccer player
- Brandin Bryant — football player
- Warren Buffett — billionaire investor and philanthropist
- Mellona Moulton Butterfield — china painter, teacher

== C ==
- Lance Cade — professional wrestler
- Lloyd Cardwell — played professional football for the Detroit Lions; coached at UNO
- Buddy Carlyle — professional baseball pitcher
- Ernie Chambers — Nebraska state senator
- Jason Christiansen — baseball pitcher
- Ozzie Cisneros — soccer player
- Joseph P. Cleland — U.S. Army major general
- Montgomery Clift — actor
- Abbie Cobb — actress
- James M. Connor — actor
- Barney Cotton — college football coach
- Shay Craig — bishop
- Terence Crawford — 5 division boxing world champion and 3 division undisputed world champion
- Edward Creighton — founder of Creighton University
- George P. Cronk — Los Angeles City Council member, 1945–52
- George Crook — US Army general
- Eric Crouch — football player, Heisman Trophy winner
- Blase J. Cupich — archbishop of the Archdiocese of Chicago

== D ==
- Nicholas D'Agosto — television and film actor
- Alfonza W. Davis — Tuskegee Airman
- Chip Davis — musician, founder of Mannheim Steamroller
- Dick Davis — NFL player
- Brian Deegan — FMX rider
- Tom Dennison — political boss of Omaha, 1890s–1933
- Destiny — live-streamer and political commentator
- Adam Devine — actor
- Ted DiBiase — former professional wrestler and Christian minister
- Mike Donehey — lead singer of Christian rock band Tenth Avenue North
- Richard Dooling — novelist, screenwriter
- David Doyle — actor
- Jeff Draheim — film editor
- DrLupo — streamer and YouTuber
- Charles W. "Chuck" Durham — civil engineer, philanthropist, chairman emeritus of HDR, Inc

== E ==
- Jake Ellenberger — professional MMA fighter in the UFC
- Marti Epstein — avante-garde composer
- Experience Estabrook — attorney general of Wisconsin
- G. Estabrook — opera composer; daughter of Experience Estabrook

== F ==
- The Faint — post-punk band
- Mike Flood — U.S. representative for Nebraska
- Henry Fonda — actor
- Peter Fonda — actor
- Gerald Ford — 38th president of the United States
- Sally Fox — member of Vermont General Assembly; lawyer

== G ==
- Jorge Garcia — actor
- Annunciata Garrotto — soprano
- Roxane Gay — writer and professor
- Bob Gibson — Baseball Hall of Fame
- Terry Goodkind — author
- Ahman Green — professional football player
- Bennett Greenspan — founder of Family Tree DNA
- Jake Guentzel — professional ice hockey player

== H ==
- Breece Hall — NFL running back
- Tim Halperin — singer-songwriter
- Raphael Hamilton — Jesuit and professor of history at Marquette University
- Ron Hansen — author, screenwriter
- Wynonie Harris — rhythm & blues singer
- Harry Haywood — African-American Communist leader
- Jean Heather — actress
- Stuart Heintzelman — U.S. Army major general
- Gregory M. Herek — social psychologist and professor
- Nick Hexum — singer/guitarist of Omaha's 311
- Hallee Hirsh — actress
- Chris Holbert — Colorado politician
- Sarah Hollins — beauty queen and TV personality
- Dave Hoppen — NBA player
- Jeremy Horn — mixed martial arts fighter
- John Howell — NFL player
- Cathy Hughes — businesswoman; founder and president of Radio One

== I ==
- Doug Ingle — keyboardist for Iron Butterfly

== J ==
- Joseph R. Jelinek — U.S. Army brigadier general, deputy director of Army National Guard
- Nikko Jenkins — convicted spree killer
- Steve Jennum — mixed martial artist
- Ryan Jensen — mixed martial arts fighter
- Marc Johnson — jazz bass player
- Thomas Berger Johnson — artist, post-impressionist painter, metal sculptor and draftsman
- Simon Joyner — singer, songwriter

== K ==
- Timothy J. Kadavy — U.S. Army major general, adjutant general of Nebraska National Guard
- Jay Karnes — actor
- Tim Kasher — singer-songwriter, Cursive and The Good Life
- Alex Kava — author
- Kenton Keith — professional football player
- Charlotte Kemp — Playboy Playmate (Miss December 1982)
- Mina Kimes — investigative journalist, ESPN magazine senior writer
- Charles Henry King — pioneer businessman
- Jaime King — actress, model
- Arlene Klasky — animator
- Chris Klein — actor
- Ed Koterba — journalist
- Jeff Koterba — editorial cartoonist, musician, author
- Jason Kreis — soccer player, coach of Real Salt Lake
- Saul Kripke — philosopher
- Swoosie Kurtz — actress

== L ==
- Frank Purdy Lahm — U.S. Army brigadier general
- Christopher Lasch — historian, social critic
- Oudious Lee — football player
- Matty Lewis — musician, Zebrahead
- Terry Lewis, one half of the songwriting and production team, Jimmy Jam and Terry Lewis
- Samuel Little — serial killer
- Myra Cohn Livingston — children's poet
- Preston Love — jazz player
- Henry T. Lynch — cancer researcher and professor at Creighton University

== M ==
- Ike Mahoney — NFL player
- Timothy Mahoney — lead guitarist of 311
- Erin McCarthy — professional ten-pin bowler, 2022 U.S. Women's Open champion
- Timothy McCoy — murder victim killed by John Wayne Gacy in 1972
- Sean McDermott — NFL head coach of Buffalo Bills
- Ed McGivern — shooter
- Dorothy McGuire — actress
- Duncan McGuire — soccer player and 2024 Olympian
- Jake Meyers — Major League Baseball outfielder and World Series champion with Houston Astros
- Andy Milder — actor
- Jay Milder — artist
- Buddy Miles — musician
- Anthony Michael Milone — Roman Catholic bishop
- Henry Monsky — attorney and communal leader
- Rowena Moore — civic and labor activist
- Carol Morris — Miss Iowa USA 1956, Miss USA 1956, Miss Universe 1956
- Gerald T. Mullin — Minnesota state legislator, lawyer, and businessman
- Frances Miller Mumaugh — painter
- Charlie Munger (1924–2023) — billionaire investor
- Fred Murree (1861–1950) — professional roller skater

== N ==
- John Najjar — auto engineer, designed Ford Mustang
- Jim Newman — television producer
- Nick Hexum — guitarist, vocalist 311 Band
- Nick Nolte — actor

== O ==
- Conor Oberst — singer-songwriter, Bright Eyes and Desaparecidos
- Tillie Olsen — author
- Jed Ortmeyer — professional ice hockey player
- Sono Osato — dancer and actress

== P ==
- John W. Patterson — African-American baseball outfielder in the Negro leagues
- Justin Patton, NBA basketball player and player for Hapoel Eilat of the Israeli Basketball Premier League, first-round selection in the 2017 NBA draft
- Niles Paul — NFL receiver for the Washington Redskins
- Alexander Payne — Oscar-winning screenwriter and director
- Neal Pionk — NHL player
- Mark Pope — NBA player
- Andrew Jackson Poppleton — politician
- Scott Porter — actor
- Nathan Post — 7th and 10th governor of American Samoa
- Ron Prince — college football coach

== Q ==
- Daniel Quinn — author

== R ==
- Anne Ramsey — actress
- Andrew Rannells — actor
- James Raschke — professional wrestler known as Baron Von Raschke
- Origen D. Richardson — fourth lieutenant governor of Michigan
- Mark Richt — college football coach
- J. Joseph Ricketts — billionaire
- Matthew Ricketts — first African-American graduate from UNMC; first African-American state legislator
- Pete Ricketts — U.S. senator; former governor of Nebraska
- Thomas S. Ricketts — owner of baseball's Chicago Cubs
- Conor Riley — professional football coach
- Trevor Roach — football player
- Andy Roddick — professional tennis player
- Johnny Rodgers — football player, 1972 Heisman Trophy winner
- Joe Rogers — Colorado lieutenant governor
- Rainbow Rowell — author
- Darin Ruf (born 1986) — major league baseball player
- Amber Ruffin — comedian and writer
- Colden Ruggles — U.S. Army brigadier general
- Edward Ruscha — artist and photographer
- John Rutherford — U.S. representative for Florida and sheriff of Jacksonville

== S ==
- Penny Sackett — astronomer and Chief Scientist of Australia
- Hunter Sallis — professional basketball player for the San Diego Clippers
- Symone Sanders — Democratic strategist, spokesperson for Bernie Sanders's 2016 presidential campaign
- Gale Sayers — professional football player, Pro Football Hall of Fame inductee
- Walter Scott, Jr. — billionaire
- Chad Sexton — drummer of 311
- Josephine Platner Shear — archaeologist and numismatist
- Leisa Sheridan — Playboy Playmate (Miss July 1993)
- JoJo Siwa — singer, dancer, actress, YouTuber and media personality
- Elliott Smith — singer/songwriter
- Q. Smith — musical theater actress
- Nicholas Sparks — author
- Skip Stephenson — actor and comedian from TV series Real People
- Sting — professional wrestler, real name Steve Borden
- Todd Storz — entrepreneur who introduced Top-40 radio format
- Jean Stothert — mayor of Omaha
- Mike Sullivan — 29th governor of Wyoming
- Sarah Rose Summers — Miss Nebraska USA 2018 and Miss USA 2018
- Carl A. Swanson — founder of Swanson
- Inga Swenson — actress

== T ==
- Jerry Tagge — NFL player for the Green Bay Packers
- Khyri Thomas (born 1996) — basketball player for Maccabi Tel Aviv of the Israeli Basketball Premier League and the EuroLeague
- JT Thor — NBA player for the Charlotte Hornets and their G League affiliate the Greensboro Swarm
- Donald E. Thorin — cinematographer
- Thomas Tibbles — late 19th-century journalist and Native American rights activist
- Chris Tormey — college football coach
- Mark Traynowicz — football player
- John Trudell — poet, Native American activist, actor
- Stanley M. Truhlsen — professor and philanthropist
- Steve Turre — jazz trombonist

== U ==
- Gabrielle Union — actress

== W ==
- Luigi Waites — jazz drummer and vibraphonist
- Eleazer Wakeley — jurist and politician
- Chris Ware — graphic novelist
- Dan Warthen (born 1952) — major league baseball pitcher and coach
- Xavier Watts — NFL player, Notre Dame standout, Omaha Burke
- Fee Waybill — singer/songwriter, real name John Waldo Waybill
- John Lee Webster — lawyer
- Geneice Wilcher — beauty pageant winner
- Paul Williams — singer-songwriter, actor
- Roger Williams — pianist
- Aaron Wills — bassist of 311
- Julie Wilson — singer and actress
- Bob Wiltfong — Daily Show correspondent; TED Talk presenter
- Andre Woolridge — professional basketball player

== X ==
- Malcolm X — human rights activist

== Y ==
- Whitney Young — civil rights activist

== Z ==
- William D. Zabel — lawyer
- Paula Zahn — news personality

== See also ==
- List of lists about Omaha, Nebraska
- List of people from North Omaha, Nebraska
- Founding figures of Omaha, Nebraska
- People from Omaha (category)
- People from Omaha by occupation (category)
