= Thomas Berger Johnson =

American painter, sculptor and draftsman (1890–1968)

- Born: 1890; Omaha, Nebraska
- Died: January 1968 (aged 77–78); Seward Nebraska
- Known for: Painting, drawing, and Metal Work
- Style: Post-Impressionism
- Spouse: Fay Sherwin

Cityscape by Thomas Berger Johnson, 1929.

Thomas Berger Johnson (1890 – January 1968) was a Nebraska artist, Post-Impressionist painter, metal sculptor, and draftsman. He was known to use bold impasto, juxtaposing colors to create movement and an almost shimmering effect, in paintings that represent Nebraska locations. Most of his work, donated by his widow, is in housed at the Nebraska History Museum in Lincoln, Nebraska. The Nebraska State Historical Society found the work important because his paintings represented places in Nebraska accurately, including some that no longer existed.

== Early life ==
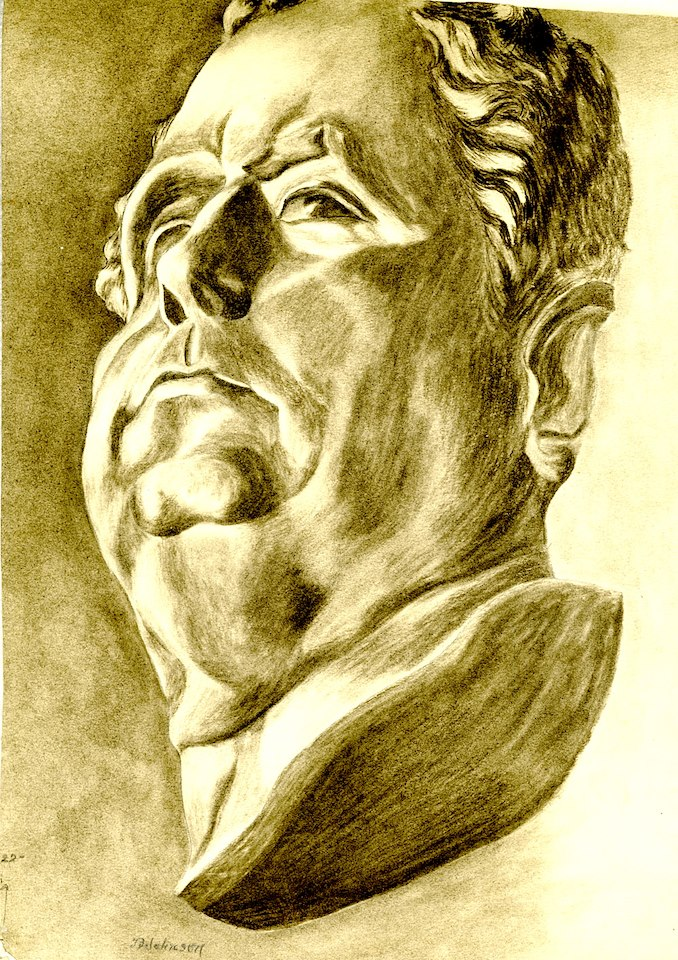
Portrait, man, Charcoal, Thomas, Johnson. Made in 1922

Thomas Johnson's father Hjalmar Johnson was a Swedish immigrant who worked as a stationary engineer at a large hotel in Omaha, Nebraska. He married Christina Maddison, a pastry cook. Thomas was the second son of the family of five, born in 1890. Johnson's first interest in art was sparked by his father, a craftsman who sketched and built ship models. When Thomas Johnson was a second-grader at the Mason Street School in Omaha, Emma Wheatley, the principal, noted his talent and gave him special instruction on art. When Tom was ten years old his father died of malaria. He was sent to live with his mother's brother Louis O. Aker, on a farm near Harvard, Nebraska. At 16 he rejoined his mother, sisters, and grandmother in Stanton, Iowa. To make money for the family he worked at Eklofs Blacksmith Shop in Valley, Nebraska.

=== Education ===
At age 31 he enrolled in the Department of Fine Arts, Bethany College, Lindsborg, Kansas, 1921-1923. He studied painting, drawing, and art history, under instructor Dr. Birger Sandzén, who influenced Johnson's style. Johnson's style was impressionistic with heavy impasto. In an article in the Omaha World-Herald magazine, in November 1969, art critic Leonard Thiessen wrote,

“His painting shows the impressionistic, heavy-impasto handling favored by the anti-establishment "Konstnaersforbundent" group in Stockholm, with which Sandzen was allied before emigrating to the U.S."

In 1923-1934, he studied at the Broadmoor Academy of Art, in Colorado Springs, Colorado, taking drawing from life with instructor Robert Reid. Johnson would go back to Bethany College in 1924-1925 to gain his Artist's Certificate, on June 4, 1925. He also studied at the Minneapolis School of Art, Minnesota, from 1926-1927.

== Career and later life ==
In 1930 Thomas Berger took a course in welding at the University of Nebraska and worked for the laboratory division for the agricultural engineering department. He worked on a tractor testing lab or motor lab. He made equipment for testing oil filters and he was listed as a co-author of a publication describing the devices. During this time he began to use his knowledge of welding to make sculptures from ornamental iron. He forged vases, lamps, lamp bases, candlesticks, and weather vanes. He used metal from iron bars, and old car parts. His sculpture titled The Phoenix (Phoenix) was composed of quarter-inch bars of iron twisted together to suggest a bird. It is 6 ft (1.8 m) high with a light bulb at the top in the plumage of the bird. His metal sculptures were described in the Omaha World-Herald magazine, in November 1969, as reminiscent of Art Nouveau and prophetic of psychedelic design.

In 1937, Thomas B. Johnson married Fay Sherwin from Harvard, Nebraska. On her mother's side, she was related to Lewis Moffitt, founder of Seward, Nebraska.

=== Drawings ===
Around 1940, Thomas B. Johnson's Christian religious beliefs inspired a series of drawings about African Americans that dealt with themes of spirituality and race. One was All God’s Children Got Wings, a pencil drawing of 1944. It depicts a group of African Americans as angels. He wrote a poem to accompany it, a common practice for his drawings. The poem reads:

All God's children got a robe,
I'm going to put on my robe and shout
all over God's Heaven.
All God's children got wings,
I'm going to put on my wings, and a'fly
all over God's Heaven."1"

His last series was on Native American spiritual beliefs. The series was unfinished due to his death. One of his last drawings was Shadow, in pencil, from 1962, depicting a silhouette of a Native American. The accompanying poem reads:

The spirit is the only REALITY. All else is but the shadow of REALITY.”[2]

=== Retirement ===
In February 1956 the Johnsons moved to Seward, and Thomas Johnson retired from the University of Nebraska. Johnson continued painting and drawing, and shared a space with Anton Pearson, a close friend and a woodcarver from Lindsborg, Kansas.

== After his death ==
In January 1968, Thomas Johnson died at 78, leaving behind 40 canvases, numerous ironwork sculptures, drawings, and block prints. After Mrs. Johnson donated the art to The Nebraska State Historical Society, Thomas Johnson's views on art were revealed in his notes. He believed his drawings were “of and for the people,” not for a “select few.” Dolores Gunnerson, writing for the Nebraska State Historical Society, claims that his local scenes show an appreciation of his surroundings and identification with the people he painted, because he was born in Omaha and worked as a blacksmith and a farm hand.

In 1969 his work was shown at the Koenig Art Gallery at Concordia University, Seward, Nebraska. Two of his paintings were showcased on PBS's Antiques Roadshow in 2016, where they were appraised at six to eight thousand dollars each by Betty Krulick.

== List of works ==
These are some of the works of art that are held by the Nebraska State Historical Society.

=== Paintings ===
Paintings include:

- Good Afternoon Ma'am, oil, 1928
- Street Scene, oil, 1938
- Sentinel, oil, 1942
- Timber Line, oil, 1942
- Mirror, oil, 1944
- Kansas City Bluffs, oil, 1945
- Patron Saint of Beggars, oil, 1946
- Ore Mill, oil, 1946
- Cathedral Spires, oil, 1947
- Glen Eyre, oil, 1948
- Pastoral, oil, 1949
- Natural Bridge, oil, 1950
- Pioneer Cabin, oil, 1951
- Tapestry, oil, 1951
- Low Sun, oil, 1953
- Lake of the Ozarks, oil, 1957
- Reflections, oil, 1957
- Bayou Reflections, oil, 1960
- River Dwellers, oil, 1960
- As the Wind Blows, oil, 1962
- Patriarchs, oil, 1962
- Sky Towers, oil, 1964
- Cliffs, oil, 1964
- Tipton's Barn, oil, 1964
- Sioux River, oil, 1965,

=== Drawings ===
Drawings include:

- Today Shalt Thou Be With Me in Paradise, charcoal, 1952
- Hill Top, pencil, 1932 Crow Ghost, pencil, 1967
- Fertility Cults - Butterfly, pencil, 1966
- The Swallow Clan, pencil, 1966
- The Star Maiden, pencil, 1967
- Baptismal, pencil, 1967
- Footprints I Have Made, pencil, 1967 Mother Corn, pencil, 1967
- Ode to the Pasque Flower, pencil, 1967
- Roll the Old Chariot Along, pencil, 1946
- Just a Closer Walk with Thee, pencil, 1945
- My Lord's A-Writing' All the Time, pencil, 1946
- Hold the Light, pencil, 1946
- Keep Me From Sinking Down, pencil, 1944
- When I'm Dead, pencil, 1951
- O' Rocks Don't Fall on Me, pencil, 1944
- Go Down Death, pencil, 1944
- Pastoral, pencil, 1949
- Was Moses Like That, pencil, undated He is Not Here For He is Risen/They Took the Money and Did As They Were Taught, pencil, 1943
- Descent From the Cross, pencil, 1943
- I Am Innocent of the Blood of This Just Person, See Ye To It, charcoal, 1942
- Jesus Being Taken to Tomb, charcoal, 1942

=== Block prints ===
Block prints include:

- Bock and Tree - Balzak, block print, undated
- Eroded Knoll, block print, 1963
- Tree-Wyoming, block print, undated
- End of Ridge, block print, undated
- Rock and Tree - Balzak, block print, undated Line Pine, block print, undated
- Slit Rock and Mulberry, block print, undated
- Shoes or Portrait of the Johnsons, block print, 1965
- Rock Ridge - South Dakota, block print, 1963
- Rock and Pine Tree, block print, undated

=== Metal works ===
Metal works include:

- Phoenix, iron, c. 1935
- Ewer, iron, c. 1935
- Lamp, iron, c. 1935
