= Jean Louise Berg Thiessen =

Jean Louise Berg Thiessen was a folk artist from Omaha, Nebraska, who worked primarily in felt. She is the mother of Nebraska artist and art critic Leonard Thiessen.

== Biography ==
Jean Louise Berg Thiessen was born in 1876 to Johanna Danielssohn of Smoland, Switzerland, and Andrew Berg of Boone, Iowa, in Sacramento, California. Her siblings included Wilhemina, Ida, Nellie, and Ed. At age ten, the family moved to Omaha, Nebraska. She began working as a dressmaker at age 14 and later ran a dress-making shop with her sister Wilhemina. Jean married Charles "Charlie" Leonard Thiessen and became a mother to their only child, Omaha World-Herald art critic and artist Leonard Thiessen.

Jean Louise Berg Thiessen created most of her work in the early 1930s. She utilized found and household materials to create "on-edge felt mosaics." Her work can be found in the Nebraska Art Collection at the Museum of Nebraska Art. Thiessen died in 1960 at the age of 84.
