= J.P. Cooke Company =

American manufacturing company

- J.P. Cooke logo
- Founded: 1887 in Omaha, Nebraska
- Founder: James and John P. Cooke
- Products: Rubber stamps
- Website: jpcooke.com

The J.P. Cooke Company manufactures and sells rubber stamps, stencils, inks, and metal tags.

The family-owned company was founded in 1887 by brothers James and John P. Cooke. James was the grandfather of current owners John and Warren Cooke. The company is currently on its fourth generation, as John's children (David, Jim, and Julie) also work at the company.

The company is regarded as one of Omaha, Nebraska's "historic companies". The company is located in a historic building in downtown Omaha, consisting of approximately 80,000 square feet of office space and manufacturing space.
