= Hunter Johnson (composer) =

American composer

Hunter Johnson (April 14, 1906 – August 27, 1998) was an American composer. His compositions include a piano sonata and the orchestral music for Martha Graham's ballets Letter to the World, based on the life and poetry of Emily Dickinson, and Deaths and Entrances. His musical style was a combination of neoclassic, neoromantic, and nationalist.

Johnson was born near Benson, North Carolina. He attended Benson High School and the University of North Carolina at Chapel Hill before leaving the state to finish his undergraduate studies at the Eastman School of Music in 1929. UNC later awarded him an honorary doctorate. He taught at the University of Michigan (1929–33), the University of Manitoba (1944–47), Cornell (1948–53), the University of Illinois (1959–65) and the University of Texas (1966–71). He retired in 1971 and returned to the family farm in Benson. He was the first composer laureate of North Carolina, an award he received in 1991.
