= Pinnacle Bank Arena =

Indoor arena in Lincoln, Nebraska, U.S.

- "The Vault"
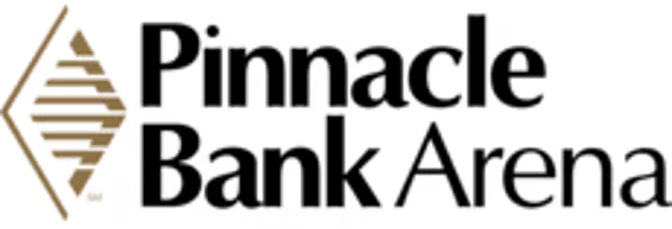

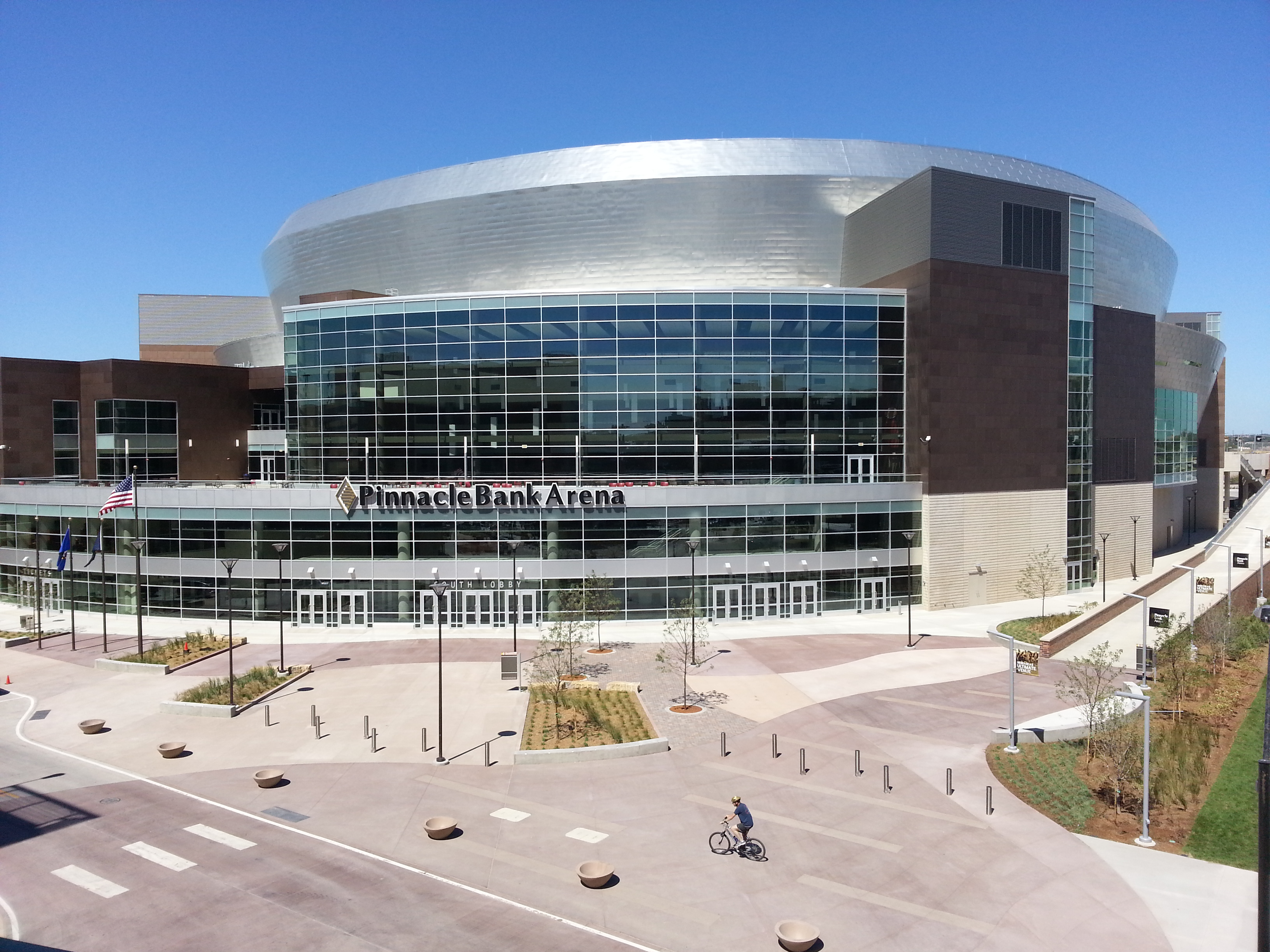
- Pinnacle Bank Arena in 2013
- Interactive map of Pinnacle Bank Arena
- Former names: West Haymarket Arena
- Address: 400 Pinnacle Arena Drive
- Location: Lincoln, Nebraska, United States
- Coordinates: 40°49′4″N 96°42′48″W
- Owner: City of Lincoln
- Operator: Legends Global
- Capacity: Basketball: 15,500; Boxing: 14,660; Ice hockey: 12,700; Volleyball: 15,290; Center stage: 16,130; End stage: 14,620; Half-house: 10,900
- Executive suites: 36
- Surface: Multi-surface
- Record attendance: 15,998 (March 9, 2014)

Construction
- Groundbreaking: September 7, 2011
- Opened: August 16, 2013
- Cost: Arena: $180,797,782 ($250 million in 2025); Project: $328,200,000 ($454 million in 2025)
- Architects: DLR Group; BVH; Clark Enersen Partners
- Structural engineer: Buro Happold
- Services engineers: M–E Engineers, Inc.
- General contractors: Hampton Construction; Mortenson Construction

Tenants
- Nebraska Cornhuskers (NCAA); Men's basketball (2013–present); Women's basketball (2013–present)

Website
- www.pinnaclebankarena.com

Pinnacle Bank Arena (PBA), known as West Haymarket Arena during construction, is a multi-purpose indoor arena located in the West Haymarket District of Lincoln, Nebraska, United States, just southwest of the University of Nebraska–Lincoln's City Campus. The 15,500-seat arena was completed in 2013 and replaced the Bob Devaney Sports Center as the home of Nebraska's men's and women's basketball teams. The arena serves as the primary large-scale entertainment venue in Lincoln and annually hosts Nebraska School Activities Association state basketball tournament games.

In its standard configuration, Pinnacle Bank Arena is the second-largest arena in the state of Nebraska and fifth-largest in the Big Ten Conference.

== History ==
=== Background ===
The possibility of a new downtown arena to host Nebraska's basketball teams and serve as the anchor of a redevelopment of the Haymarket District was noted years prior to Pinnacle Bank Arena's September 2011 groundbreaking. The Pershing Center, then the largest entertainment venue in Lincoln, had a listed capacity of just 4,526 and was considered inadequate to meet the logistical demands of modern concerts. The larger but aging Bob Devaney Sports Center, home to Nebraska's indoor sports teams since 1976, was similarly incapable of hosting large-scale performances and required tens of millions of dollars of maintenance updates. In 2007, the City of Lincoln completed a study of five potential sites for a 12,000-seat, $50 million arena and identified its preferred location in the West Haymarket near the Lincoln Main Post Office, approximately a quarter-mile southwest of the University of Nebraska–Lincoln's City Campus.

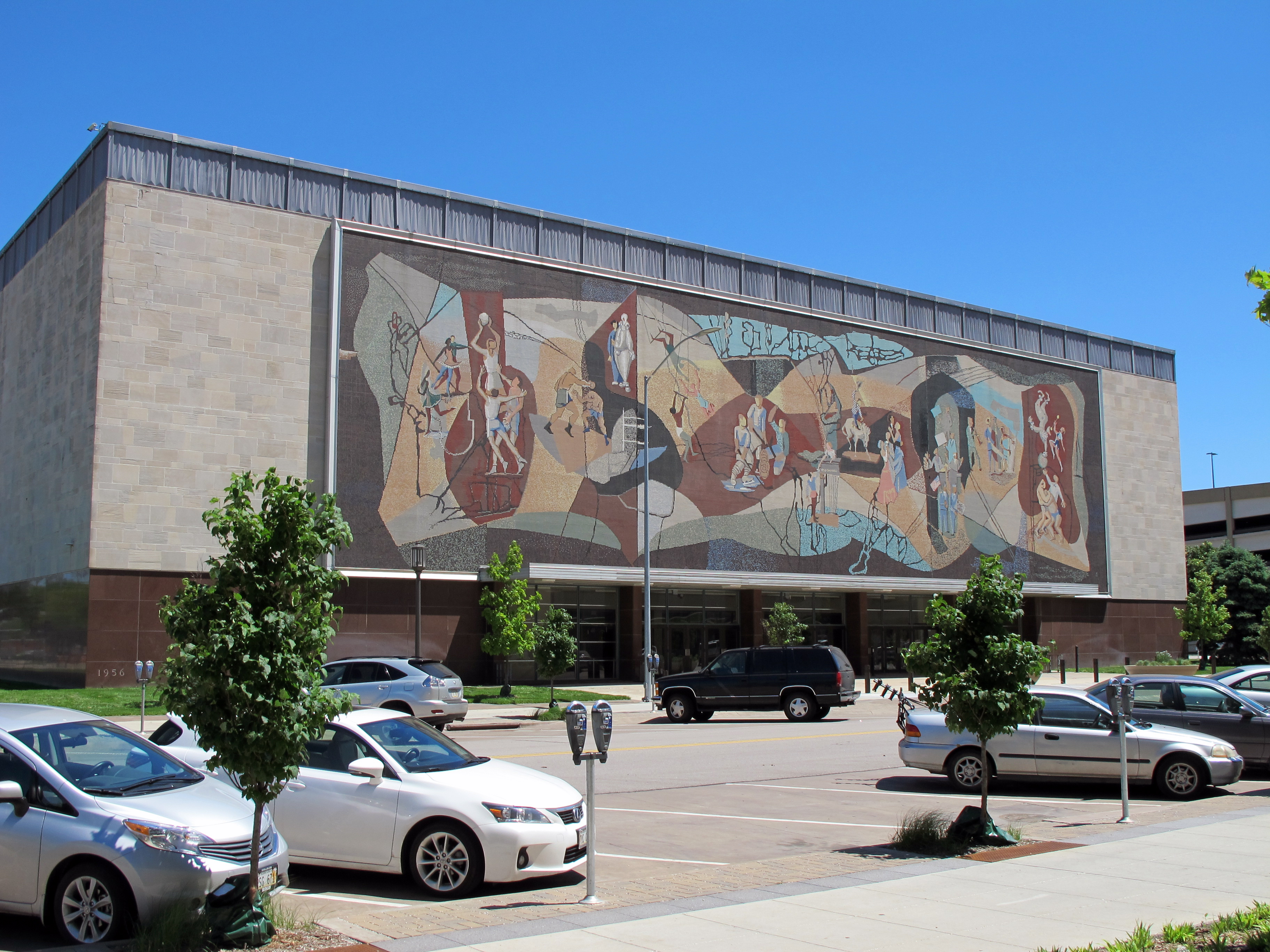
The 4,526-seat Pershing Center was Lincoln's largest entertainment venue prior to the construction of Pinnacle Bank Arena

The project's momentum slowed during the 2008 financial crisis, but reemerged on a larger scale when renderings of a $200 million to $300 million complex were released. The City of Lincoln established the West Haymarket Joint Public Agency (JPA) in conjunction with the University of Nebraska–Lincoln to control the financing of the proposed arena and oversee a potential redevelopment of the entire West Haymarket area. In May 2010, fifty-six percent of Lincoln voters approved a $25 million general obligation bond to fund the arena, with the city eventually repaying the remainder of the Haymarket project's estimated $344 million price tag from several revenue streams. These included a potential naming rights agreement and the university's rent payments to host basketball games, but the most significant was a "turn back" occupation tax, which was initially estimated to run through 2045 and includes a two-percent tax on restaurants and bars and a four-percent tax on hotels and rental cars. A decade after the arena's opening, the JPA said the tax had generated $202 million in revenue, far more than expected, and as a result it was ahead of schedule in its bond repayments.

=== Construction ===
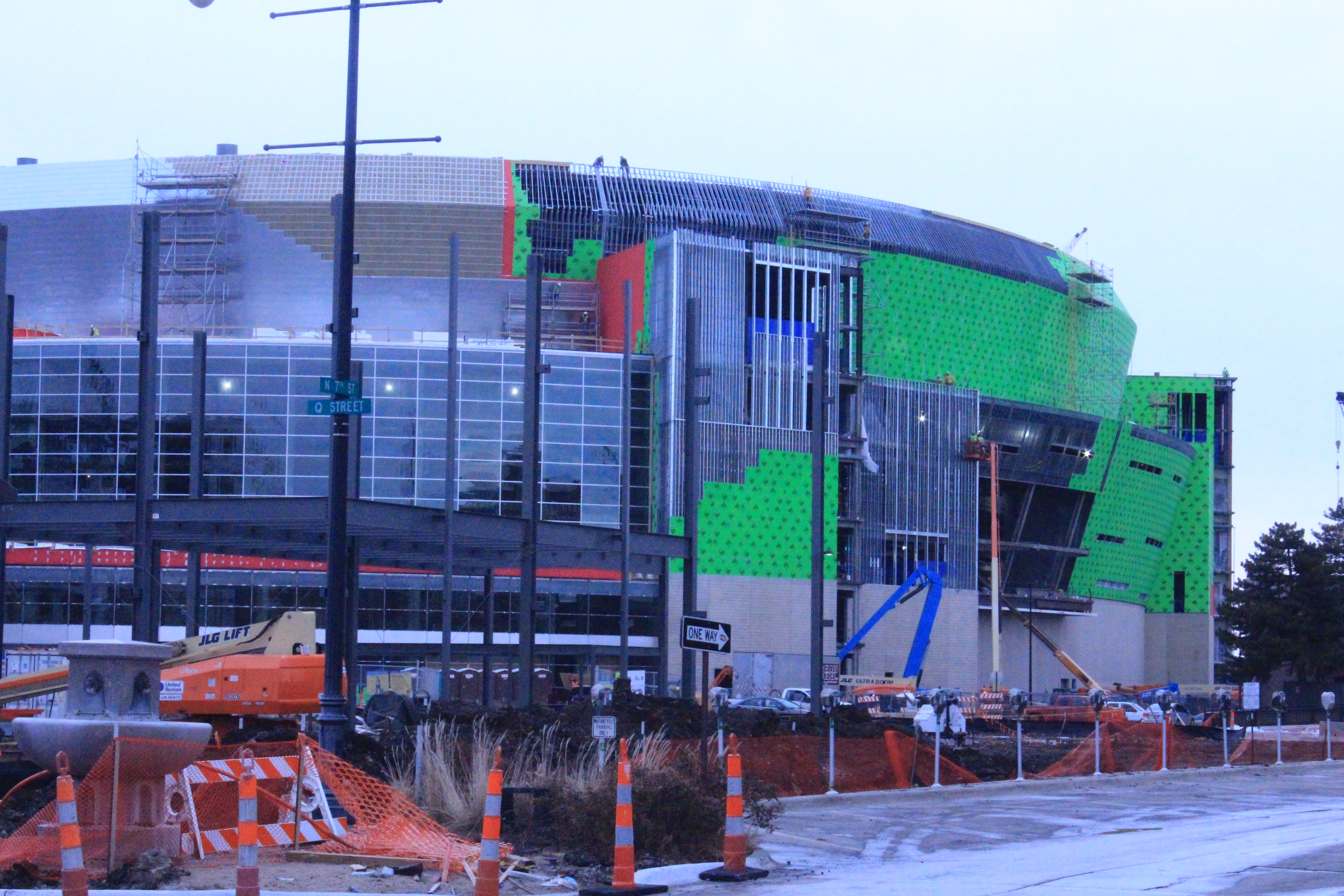
Pinnacle Bank Arena during construction in January 2013

In August 2011, Lincoln-based Hampton Construction and Minneapolis-based Mortenson Construction began concrete and foundation work for the arena and nearby parking garages. The $63 million price tag for this work, which included structural steel and roofing material, represented over forty percent of the arena's initially planned $150 million construction cost. Development of the arena was made difficult given the space constraints of the site, between two railway lines which could not be relocated until after construction was scheduled to begin. The arena was therefore constructed "inside out" with interior concrete work largely performed prior to the erection of the steel superstructure, which was assembled as more of the site became available. Approximately $50 million was spent to reroute the railroad tracks, construct a new railway station (the original station, the Burlington Northern Railroad Depot, was converted into an antique mall), and remove any fuel-contaminated soil.

Pinnacle Bank signed a twenty-five-year, $11.25 million naming rights agreement in December 2011. Upon completion, the 470,000-square-foot building had a listed arena capacity of 15,500 in its standard configuration, with thirty-six executive suites, twenty loge boxes, 832 club seats, two private club lounges, seventy-three concession areas, and a Huskers Authentic team store. The arena has no upper deck around its north end, allowing room for a potential expansion to a capacity of approximately 18,500. The first event at the arena was the University of Nebraska–Lincoln's summer commencement ceremony on August 16, 2013, though PBA did not host its official "grand opening" event until the following month.

== Basketball ==
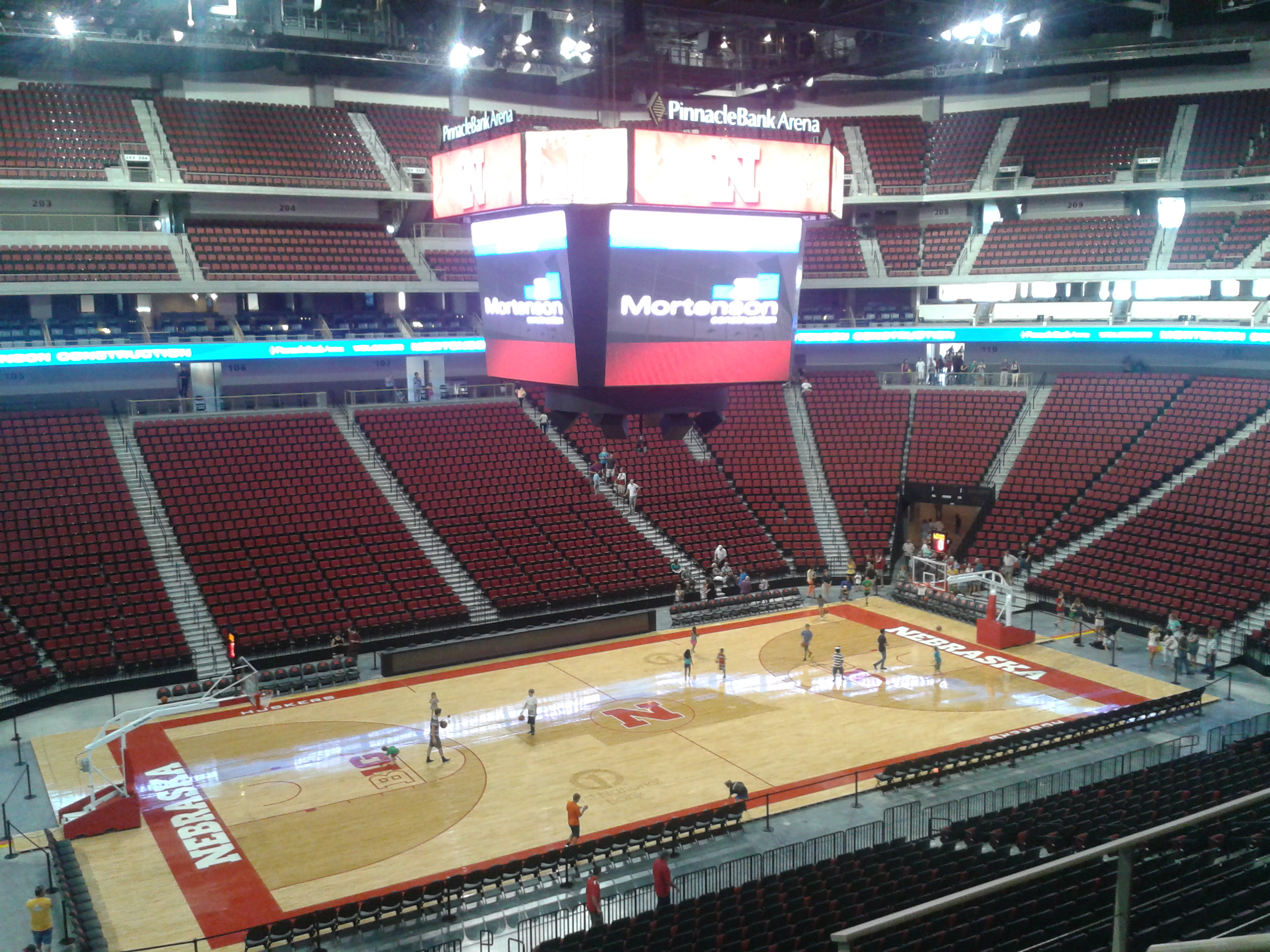
The interior of Pinnacle Bank Arena just before its grand opening in September 2013

Nebraska's men's and women's basketball teams each played and won their first regular-season game in the arena on November 8, 2013. For men's games, the student section (the "Red Zone") was placed at midcourt directly behind the team benches, with the stated goal of increasing student interest and providing a more intense atmosphere for opposition. The men's team went 15–1 in its inaugural season at what became known as "The Vault," which included a late-season victory over Wisconsin that propelled the program to its first NCAA Division I tournament since 1998. Ten years later, the team went 18–1 and defeated No. 1 Purdue at Pinnacle Bank Arena, NU's first victory over the country's top-ranked team in forty-two years.

Nebraska's men's program has ranked in the national top twenty-five in attendance each year it has played at Pinnacle Bank Arena. Its women's program has never ranked lower than twentieth.

PBA hosted regional semifinal and regional final games in the 2014 NCAA Division I women's basketball tournament, which featured eventual national champion Connecticut. Fourth-seeded Nebraska was upset by BYU in the second round and did not play on its home court. The arena hosted a sold-out preseason game between the NBA's Dallas Mavericks and Chicago Bulls in 2015; the Bulls won on a last-second shot by former Creighton standout Doug McDermott. Chicago was coached by Fred Hoiberg, who returned to PBA four years later as Nebraska's head coach. The Minnesota Timberwolves and Denver Nuggets played the arena's second NBA preseason game the following year.

The arena annually hosts several games of the Nebraska School Activities Association state basketball tournaments.

== Concerts and other events ==
Michael Bublé played the first concert at Pinnacle Bank Arena on September 13, 2013. It has since hosted hundreds of bands and artists, including the Eagles, Sleep Token, Paul McCartney, Billy Joel, Elton John, Metallica, Twenty One Pilots, Jay-Z, Cher, Katy Perry, Lorde, Fleetwood Mac, Kenny Chesney, Snoop Dogg, Blake Shelton, Lil' Wayne, Carrie Underwood, Justin Bieber, Kiss, Iron Maiden, Kendrick Lamar, P!nk, and Morgan Wallen. On May 20, 2015, Eric Church performed in front of a crowd of 15,823, the highest attendance at the arena for an event other than a Nebraska men's basketball game. An April 23, 2022 George Strait concert set an arena record with $3.1 million in gross sales.

Notable among the arena's non-musical events are the Harlem Globetrotters, Cirque du Soleil, Monster Jam, WWE SmackDown, Disney on Ice, and several professional boxing and mixed martial arts events, including a 2017 fight between Terence Crawford and Julius Indongo in which Omaha native Crawford became the undisputed light welterweight champion. Comedians who have performed at the arena include Jeff Dunham, Larry the Cable Guy, Jeff Foxworthy, Daniel Tosh, and Bert Kreischer.

In 2021, the Lincoln-Lancaster County Health Department set up a series of clinics at Pinnacle Bank Arena to provide COVID-19 vaccinations, issuing over 130,000 vaccine doses at the venue.
