= Composer laureate =

A composer laureate is a position awarded by a government as an honor to a musical composer.

== United States ==
=== Arkansas ===
The first composer laureate of Arkansas (and the first composer laureate to be designated in the United States) was W. Francis McBeth, who served as Composer laureate from 1975 until his death in 2012. No new composer laureate has been selected since.

=== Nebraska ===
The Potash Twins were selected as Nebraska's first composer laureates in 2025 by Governor Jim Pillen.

=== North Carolina ===
Hunter Johnson was selected as North Carolina's first composer laureate in 1991, a position which he held until his death in 1998.
