= W. Francis McBeth =

American composer

William Francis McBeth
- Born: March 9, 1933; Ropesville, Texas
- Died: January 6, 2012
- Occupations: Composer, Professor, Conductor
- Spouse: Mary Sue White
- Children: Laura Murphy, Matthew McBeth

William Francis McBeth (March 9, 1933 – January 6, 2012) was an American composer, whose wind band works are highly respected. His primary musical influences included Clifton Williams, Bernard Rogers, and Howard Hanson. The popularity of his works in the United States during the last half of the twentieth century led to many invitations and appearances as a guest conductor, where he often conducted the premiere performances of some of his compositions, the majority of which were commissioned. His conducting activities took him to forty-eight states, three Canadian provinces, Japan, and Australia; and for a number of years he was principal conductor of the Arkansas Symphony Orchestra in the capital of Little Rock. At one time, his "Double Pyramid Balance System" was a widely used pedagogical tool in the concert band world.

From 1957 until his retirement in 1996, McBeth taught at Ouachita Baptist University in Arkadelphia, Arkansas.

== Career ==
McBeth was born in Ropesville, Texas (near Lubbock). His parents were Joseph Phinis McBeth, a Baptist minister, and Lillie May Carpenter McBeth. McBeth had a brother, Harold, and a sister, Laura Fay. He had an early start to his musical training, studying piano with his mother and taking up the trumpet in the second grade. He graduated from Irving High School in Irving, Texas where he served as President of the IHS Senior Class of 1951, as well as President of Future Farmers of America. He lettered in football and track and was a member of the Tiger Band and choir. (Mary Sue White McBeth, wife of Francis, was also in the Irving High Tiger Band class of 1951.) He attended Hardin-Simmons University in Abilene, Texas. While an undergraduate at H-SU, McBeth played in the university band. From December 1952 to January 1953, the band traveled with U.S. Camp Shows to Europe. He also played string bass in a jazz combo, which was unusual for the time period due to widespread segregation throughout the South.

McBeth married Mary Sue White in 1953. They had a daughter, Laura and a son, Matthew. He served in the military from 1954 to 1956 with the 101st Airborne Band at Fort Jackson, South Carolina, and the 98th Army Band at Fort Rucker, Alabama. He was initiated into the University of Texas Alpha Iota chapter of Phi Mu Alpha Sinfonia in 1957.

In 1962, McBeth conducted the Arkansas All-State Band, with future president Bill Clinton playing in the tenor saxophone section. He served as the third conductor of the Arkansas Symphony Orchestra from 1970 until 1973. He died on January 6, 2012 (age 78) in Arkadelphia, Arkansas.

== Awards ==
The most outstanding of his awards have been the Presley Award at Hardin-Simmons University in 1954; the Howard Hanson Prize at the Eastman School of Music for his Third Symphony in 1963; an ASCAP Special Award each consecutive year from 1965 to present; the American School Band Directors Association's Edwin Franko Goldman Award in 1983; election as Fellow of the American Wind and Percussion Artists by the National Band Association in 1984; a National Citation from Phi Mu Alpha Sinfonia fraternity in 1985; Phi Mu Alpha Sinfonia's Charles E. Lutton Man of Music Award in 1988 for his achievement and continued contribution to American music; Kappa Kappa Psi's Distinguished Service to Music Medal in 1989; Mid-West International Band and Orchestra Clinic's Medal of Honor in 1993; the John Philip Sousa Foundations Sudler Medal of Honor in 1999; and election as President of the American Bandmasters Association. In 1975 McBeth was appointed Composer Laureate of the State of Arkansas by the governor, becoming the first Composer Laureate named in the United States.

== Works ==
=== Works for Orchestra ===
==== Symphonies ====
- 1955 Symphony No. 1, opus 7
- 1956 Symphony No. 2, opus 10
- 1963 Symphony No. 3, opus 27
- 1969 Symphony No. 4, opus 49A

==== Other Orchestral Works ====
- 1956 Suite on a Biblical Event, opus 8
- 1956 Overture for Orchestra, opus 9
- 1957 Pastorale, for woodwinds and strings, opus 11
- 1960 Pastorale and Allegro, opus 21
- 1961 Allegro Agitato, opus 24
- 1963 Quanah, opus 29
- 1974 Grace, Praeludium and Response, opus 53
- 1974 The Badlands, opus 54A
- 1975 Kaddish, opus 57A

=== Works for Winds ===
(The bulk of McBeth's wind ensemble and concert band music is published by Southern Music Company of San Antonio, Texas.)

- 1954 Orfadh, opus 3
- 1954 Divertimento for Band, opus 4
- 1957 Andalusia, opus 14a
- 1957 Call and Response, opus 14b
- 1959 Cavata, opus 17
- 1960 Second Suite for Band, opus 20
- 1961 Narrative, opus 23
- 1961 Chant and Jubilo, opus 25
- 1963 Mosaic, opus 29A
- 1964 Reflections Past, opus 30
- 1964 Joyant Narrative, opus 34
- Two Fanfares
  1. 1959 Thaxton Fanfare, opus 16
  2. 1964 Cooper Fanfare, opus 32
- 1965 Battaglia, opus 36
- Two Symphonic Fanfares
  1. 1965 Jenkins Fanfare, opus 35
  2. 1966 TCU Fanfare, opus 38
- 1966 Cantique and Faranade, opus 39
- 1967 Texas Tech Fanfare, for two wind orchestras, opus 43
- Symphonic Sounds for the Field
  1. 1967 Bowie Fanfare, opus 41
  2. 1968 Fredericksburg Fanfare, opus 45
- 1967 Masque, opus 44
- Big Sounds for young bands
  1. 1967 Weiss Fanfare, opus 42
  2. 1968 Jayton Fanfare, opus 46
- 1969 Drammatico, opus 48
- 1969 Divergents, opus 49
- 1972 The Seventh Seal, opus 50
- 1973 Festive Centennial, opus 51
- 1973 To be Fed by Ravens, opus 52
- 1974 Capriccio Concertant, opus 54
- 1975 Kaddish for Symphonic Band, opus 57
- 1976 New Canaan, opus 58
- 1977 Canto, opus 61
- 1979 Caccia, opus 62
- 1979 Cavata, opus 63
- 1981 The Feast of Trumpets, opus 64
- 1981 Grace Praeludium, opus 65
- 1982 Flourishes, opus 66
- 1983 Praises, opus 70
- 1984 Beowulf – An Heroic Trilogy, opus 71
- 1986 To the Unknowns, opus 73
- 1986 With Sounding Trumpets, opus 74
- 1987 The Fifth Trumpeter, opus 75
- 1988 They Hung Their Harps in the Willows, opus 77
- 1990 Of Sailors and Whales, opus 78
  1. Ishmael
  2. Queequeg
  3. Father Mapple
  4. Ahab
  5. The White Whale
- 1991 Drayton Hall Esprit, opus 79
- 1992 Daniel in the Lion's Den, opus 80
- 1992 This Land Of El Dorado, opus 81
- 1993 Wine From These Grapes, opus 83
- 1993 Through Countless Halls of Air, opus 84
  1. First Flight – Daedalus And Icarus,
  2. Kitty Hawk – Orville And Wilbur,
  3. High Flight – BeeGee and the Blackbird
- 1997 The Sea Treaders
- Come Wandering Shepherds
- Eulogies by the Bard of Great Falls
- Fanfare "The Lions of North Bridge"
- Lauds And Tropes
  1. Laud I, II.
  2. Trope I, III.
  3. Laud II, IV.
  4. Trope II, V.
  5. Laud III
- Tenebrae
- The Gathering of the Waters
- When Honor Whispers And Shouts
- Variants on a Chorale of Clifton Williams (unpublished, 1977)
- When Rossi Strikes
- The Dream Catcher
- Scaramouche
- Estampie

=== Pedagogical works ===
- Effective Performance of Band Music: Solutions to specific problems of 20th Century Music (Southern Music Co. 1972)
- New Theories of Theory: Helpful New Ideas for the Understanding of 18th Century Harmony (Southern Music Co. 1979)
- The Complete Honor Band Manual: A guide for the Preparation and Organization of Honor Band Clinics (Southern Music Co. 1986)
- Twentieth Century Techniques of Composition for the Beginning Student (Delta Publications 1994)
