= Leonard Thiessen =

Nebraskan artist and critic

- Born: Charles Leonard Thiessen, Jr. May 2, 1902; Omaha, Nebraska
- Died: March 27, 1989 (aged 86); Omaha, Nebraska
- Known for: Art Critic and First Executive Director of the Nebraska Arts Council

Leonard Thiessen was an artist from Omaha, Nebraska, best known for his work as the first art critic for the Omaha World-Herald and for his contributions to Nebraska arts administration. He was the first Executive Director of the Nebraska Arts Council and encouraged the establishment of Nebraska art collections and museums. Thiessen worked in painting, design, printmaking, and mural making.

== Early life ==
Charles Leonard Thiessen, Jr. was born on May 3, 1902, in Omaha, Nebraska, to parents Charles "Charlie" Leonard Thiessen, Sr. and Jean Louise Berg Thiessen. He was raised as an only child by his parents and aunt Wilhelmina "Minnie" Berg. His family was active in the Omaha arts scene, exposing Leonard to theater, dance, and music from a young age. His mother was a local folk artist who worked in felt and fabric art, and his father worked for an Omaha printing company. The family was closely involved with the local Episcopal Church.

At age 11, Leonard Thiessen and his family lost their home in the Easter Tornado of 1913. They then moved their household to Stone Avenue in North Omaha, which Leonard would keep as a permanent address throughout the rest of his life. He attended Miller Park Public School and St. John's Protestant School before graduating from Omaha Central High School in 1919. As a teenager, he drew illustrations for his school newspaper and assisted for an architectural firm.

== Education ==
Leonard Thiessen attended the University of Omaha from 1921 to 1922 to study journalism and fine art. He was a gallery assistant for the Art Institute of Omaha and illustrator for the university newspaper. He later transferred to the University of Nebraska to study design and architecture from 1925 to 1926 while freelancing agricultural illustrations for the Omaha Bureau of Advertising and Engineering. Thiessen's professors included Dwight Kirsch, Louise Austin, Mari Sandoz, Weldon Kees, and Loren Eiseley. He was active in two fraternities, first in Phi Sigma Phi at the University of Omaha and then in Pi Kappa Alpha at University of Nebraska.

Leonard's Aunt Wilhelmina took him on trips in the 1920's to the East Coast of the United States and to Europe to expose him to art museums and art history. During the 1930's, Thiessen would study art and design abroad at multiple fine art institutions in Europe. He spent a summer studying drawing and painting at the Académie de la Grande Chaumière in Paris, which marked the beginning of his focus on what he called "serious painting." Thiessen then studied at the Heatherly School of Fine Art in London before enrolling at the Swedish Royal Academy of Art in Stockholm in 1932. Here, Thiessen studied under artist and professor Otte Skeold until he graduated in 1938.

== Career ==
Prior to his European studies, Thiessen began a career in interior design and decorating in Lincoln, Nebraska. He also freelanced as a muralist in Lincoln, Omaha, and New York City. Upon his return to Omaha from Europe in 1938, Thiessen began writing art columns for the Omaha World-Herald and Lincoln Journal Star. He would become the first regular Omaha World-Herald art critic, working between 1938 and 1950, and then returning from 1963 until retirement.

In 1941, Thiessen accepted a position in Des Moines, Iowa, as supervisor of Iowa's cultural program for the federal Works Progress Administration. Thiessen succeeded Grant Wood in this role before the program stopped in 1941 with the beginning of World War II. Thiessen volunteered for the army in 1942 and served as a draftsman for the U.S. Air Force Intelligence Forces in Kettering, England. After serving four years in the military, Thiessen returned to America to work two years as the director of the Gertrude Herbert Memorial Institute of Art in Augusta, Georgia.

Thiessen returned to Nebraska to encourage the state's development of art administration. He was a leading figure in the establishment of the Nebraska Arts Council, acting as the first Executive Director from 1966 to 1974. He also supported the establishment of the Nebraska Art Collection at the Museum of Nebraska Art in Kearney, Nebraska. Throughout his career, he worked closely with Nebraska museums and universities, including the Joslyn Art Museum in Omaha, Nebraska, and the Sheldon Museum of Art in Lincoln, Nebraska. In 1967, he served as editor for a centennial catalogue Nebraska Art Today. Thiessen taught various classes throughout his career, including art history and appreciation classes at the Joslyn Art Museum and art classes at Isabella Threlkeld's studio. Thiessen served over ten years on the board of the Museum of Nebraska Art after contributing to its founding. Throughout his career and during retirement, Thiessen would return multiple times to Europe to study art and art administration systems.

Leonard Thiessen received multiple awards and recognitions for his artistic career and work on Nebraska arts administration development. In 1959, he received an Elmer award from the Associated Artists of Omaha. He was among the first group of artists to receive a Governor's Arts Award in 1978 for his work on the Nebraska Arts Council. He also held an honorary degree from Creighton University and was an honorary life member of Omaha Artists Inc.

Thiessen spent his retirement in his home on Stone Avenue creating art and remaining involved in the local art scene until his passing in 1989 at the age of 87.

== Art ==
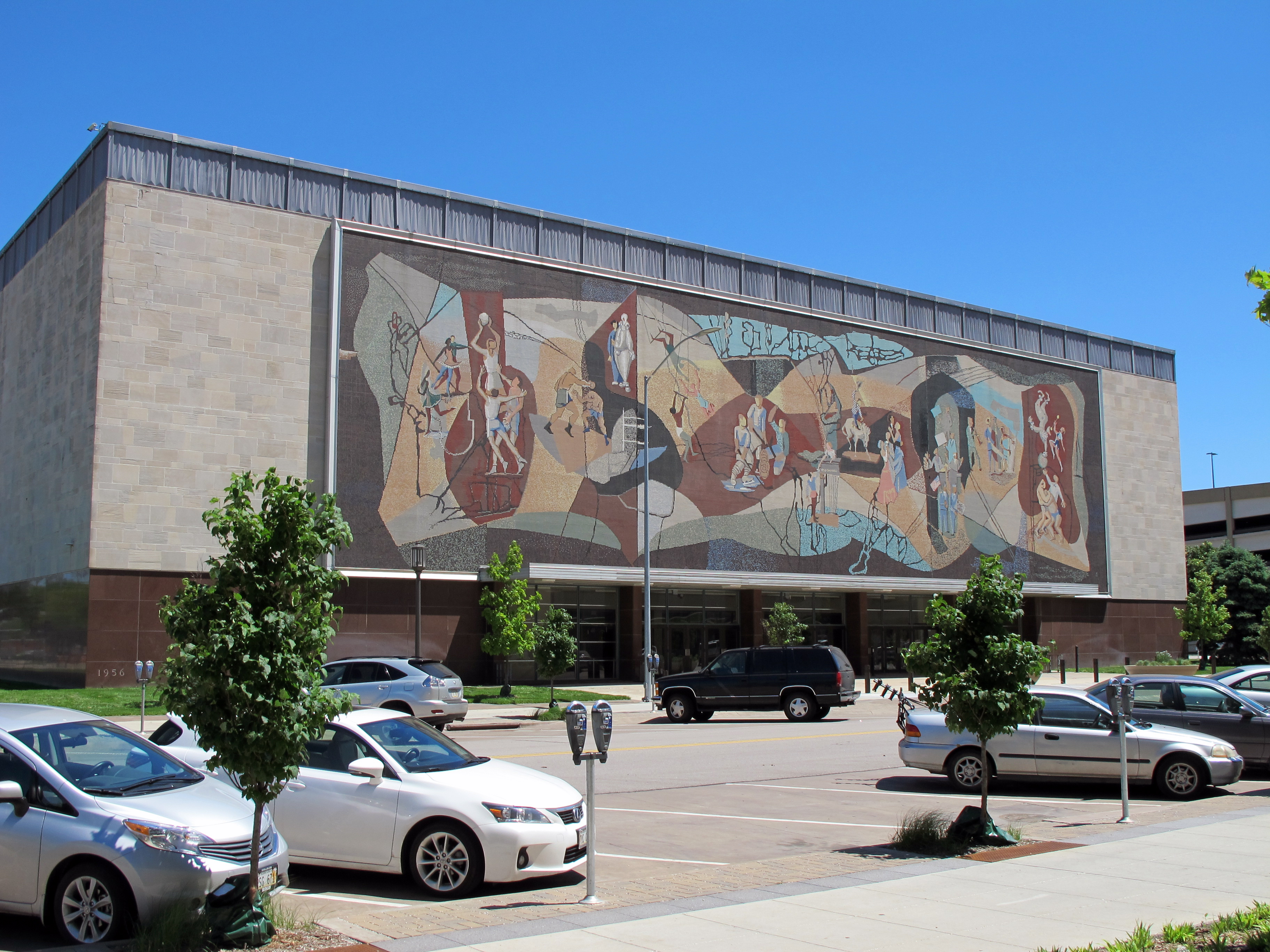
Pershing Center Mural, 2015

Thiessen's body of work consists of paintings, works on paper, printmaking, design, and murals. His paintings often included inspiration and imagery from his travels in Europe. Thiessen produced work using both traditional methods from his formal fine arts education, including still lives and architectural subjects, as well as actively experimenting with new methods and Modernist art. Thiessen was commissioned alongside Bill J. Hammon in 1955 to design what was the largest mosaic mural in the U.S. at the time of its creation for the Pershing Center in Lincoln, Nebraska.

His work can be found in collections at Museum of Nebraska Art, the Joslyn Art Museum, and the Sheldon Museum of Art. During his life, he showed in numerous group and solo shows, including exhibitions at the Joslyn Museum of Art. There have been multiple retrospective exhibitions on his body of work that spans over fifty years, including one at the Antiquarium gallery in Omaha and most recently in 2019 at the Museum of Nebraska Art.
