= Right at Home =

International franchise system for in-home care

The Right at Home logo

Right at Home is an American franchise company offering in-home care to seniors and adults with disabilities. Most Right at Home offices are independently owned and operated through local franchise offices. The company's headquarters is in Omaha, Nebraska, with over 700 franchise locations in the U.S. and five other countries.

== History ==
Right at Home was founded in 1995 by Allen Hager in Nebraska. Hager was a hospital administrator who says that he repeatedly witnessed patients returning to the hospital after being discharged. He believed that patients were not getting adequate care once they returned home. According to Hager, the company’s first client was a retired farmer who wanted someone to drive him around in a 1958 Chevy truck. Hager was able to locate a qualified caregiver who could also drive an old-fashioned, manual transmission vehicle and that launched the company. Margaret Haynes is the current CEO.

Right at Home began international franchising in 2009 and now has Master Franchisees in Australia, Canada, Ireland, the Netherlands, and the United Kingdom.

== Recognition ==
A 2014 Forbes article placed Right at Home at No. 2 on a list of “The Best Franchises in America.” In March 2014 Franchise Times ranked the company as No. 27 on a list of “the smartest growing brands.” An article in Black Enterprise magazine from June 2014 mentions Right at Home as one of the "Hot Franchise Opportunities". Right at Home was also placed at No. 199 on Franchise Times Top 200 in October 2014. Forbes also placed it third for “Best Franchises list for up to $150,000 investment” in both 2014 and 2015. Right at Home 2014 Caregiver of the Year, Mary Hartsock was honored as The Home Care Association of America, Caregiver of the Year. In March 2015 Franchise Times listed the company as No. 23 on its "Fast and Serious" list of the smartest growing brands. Right at Home of the United Kingdom was named The British Franchise Association Emerging Franchisor of the Year Award in 2014. The UK company was also a finalist for the Smith and Henderson Best Franchise award for businesses requiring a £75 thousand or larger investment. In 2017 Right at Home UK was awarded "UK Best Franchise Award" for the second successive year having been finalists in 2015 and 2014, and also retained 5-star franchisee satisfaction status in the Smith and Henderson Franchise Satisfaction Benchmark which forms the basis of the award shortlist; for the fifth consecutive year. Right at Home Ireland was a finalist for the Irish Franchise Awards held in March 2015. The Home Care Association of America announced that a Right at Home caregiver made the finalist list for their 2022 Caregiver of the Year Award. Caring.com recognized Right at Home with "Caring Star of 2023" Award in December 2022. In January 2023, Home Care Pulse announced that 249 Right at Home locations were nationally recognized with multiple 2023 Best of Home Care Awards, and topped four of the five award categories with the highest number of locations earning recognition out of more than 3,000 agencies and independents across the country. Also in January 2023, Right at Home was listed in McKnight's Homecare's Top 200 Franchises List. Right at Home was named one of the 10 best home care companies in the U.S. by Inventiva in March 2023.

== Philanthropy ==
Corporate Philanthropy for Right at Home includes their work with Free Wheelchair Mission. Members of the corporate team participated in a 10-day trip to Ecuador to assemble and deliver 250 wheelchairs to people in need, providing them with the gift of mobility. Right at Home raised $94,000 to fund the wheelchairs and the trip. To date, Right at Home as raised a total of $129,388, funding additional wheelchairs and trips to Mexico, Costa Rica and a planned trip to Vietnam in 2023 with the goal of providing wheelchairs to those without mobility.

In January 2023, Right at Home offices came together in support of Josiah's House by supplying everyday items for the children who live there. Josiah's House runs family-style homes that provide vulnerable boys and girls with the basic necessities, education, life skills and family home atmosphere needed to succeed.
