= The Potash Twins =

American musicians (born 1993)

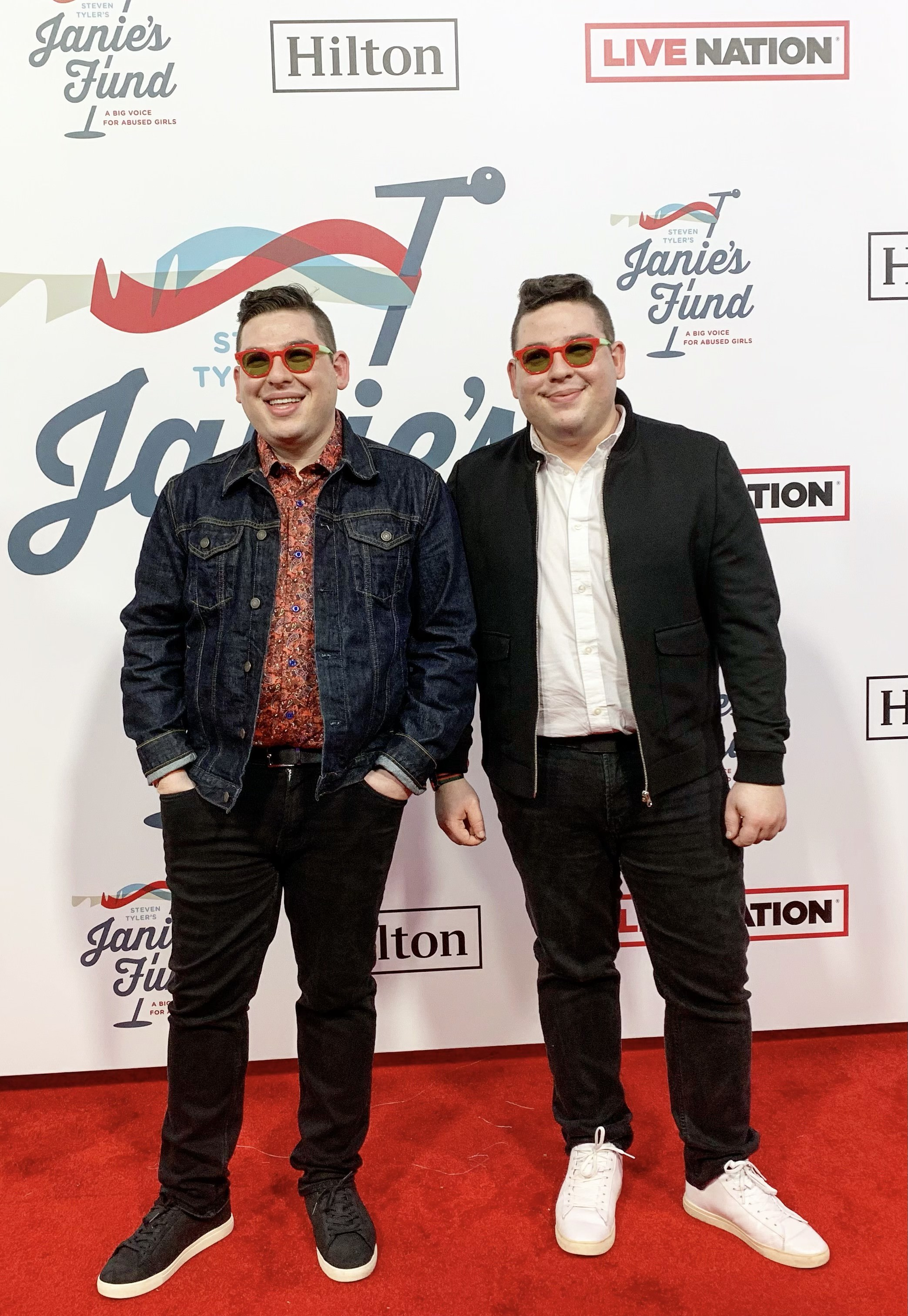
- Potash Twins attend Steven Tyler's Grammy Party

Background information
- Born: Adeev and Ezra Potash; October 18, 1993 (age 32); Omaha, Nebraska, U.S.
- Genres: Jazz; Hip hop; Pop; Trap
- Occupation: Horn section Television Personalities
- Instrument: Trumpet (Adeev) Trombone (Ezra)
- Award: Composer Laureates of Nebraska (2025–present)
- Website: thepotashtwins.com

Adeev and Ezra Potash (pronounced Poe-tash) professionally known as The Potash Twins are American identical twin musicians and television personalities from Omaha, Nebraska. The twins have hosted several TV shows on Food Network, Bravo TV and Travel Channel.. They have collaborated with artists including John Legend, the Jonas Brothers, Diplo, Snoop Dogg, Lil Baby, Jon Batiste, Robert Glasper, Major Lazer and Wynton Marsalis. In 2025, the twins were named Nebraska’s first Composer Laureates by Governor Jim Pillen.

== Early life and education ==
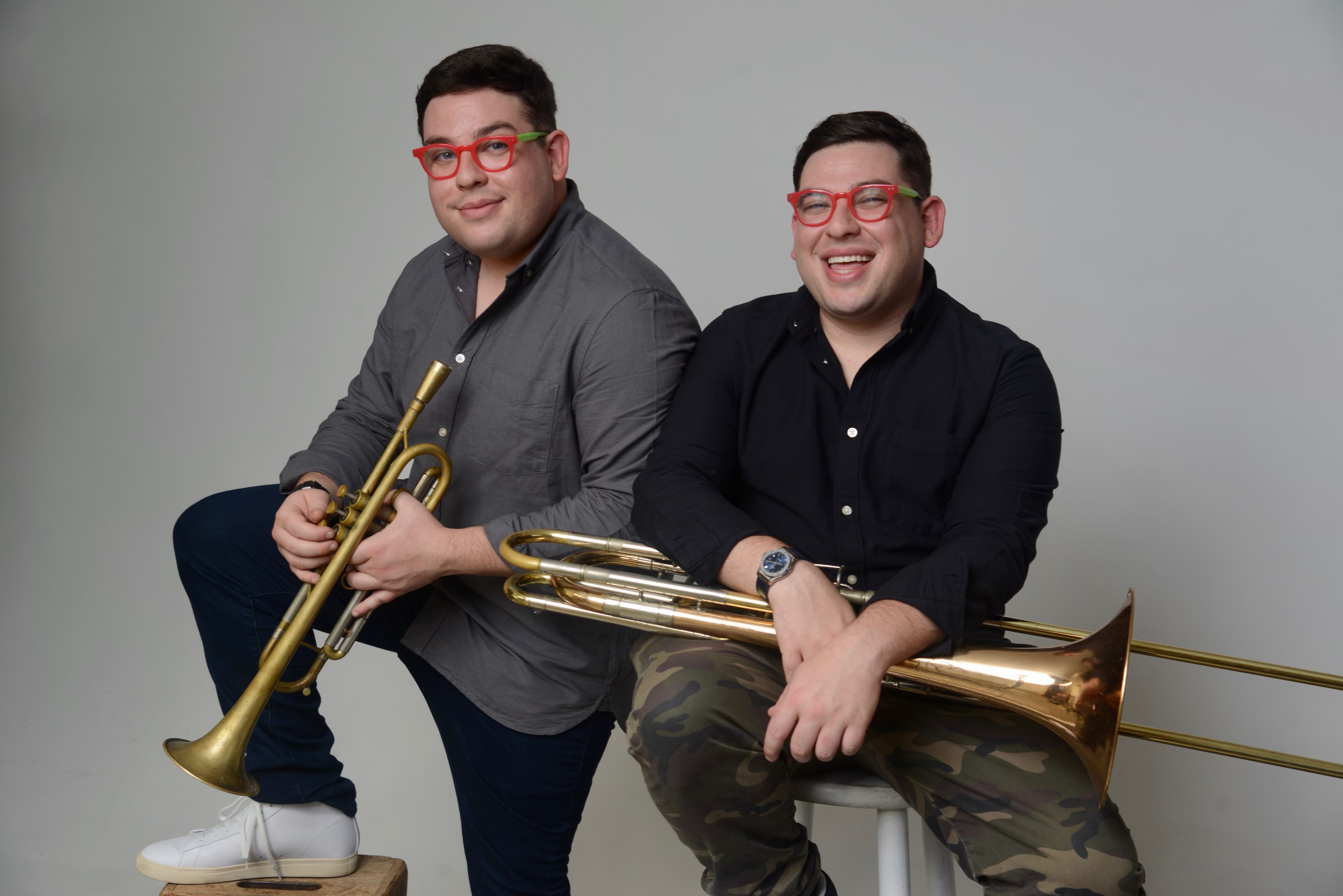
From left to right, Adeev with his trumpet and Ezra with his trombone, posing at a studio in Los Angeles.

Born on October 18, 1993, the twins grew up in Omaha, Nebraska, attended Westside High School, and were a part of the award-winning Westside Concert Jazz Band. Their father was a director of the Anti-Defamation League Texas and later the CEO of the Jewish Federation of Omaha. They took an early interest in food thanks to their mother, who traveled abroad for work.

== Music career ==
While in Omaha, Ezra and Adeev performed for Warren Buffett and were asked to perform on several occasions for his Berkshire Hathaway Shareholders meeting with the Westside Jazz Combo. The twins were discovered by Wynton Marsalis in Lincoln, Nebraska, in 2008 and helped them apply to music conservatories in New York City.

In 2012, the duo's first album, Twintuition, was released on Amazon, iTunes and Spotify. Two years later, the twins were nominated for Best Jazz for the Omaha Entertainment and Arts Awards. They became co-artistic directors at the Love's Jazz & Arts Center in Omaha.

In 2015, their second and eponymous album The Potash Twins, reached #9 on the iTunes Jazz chart. The next year, Ezra and Adeev participated in a TV competition show in China where they represented the United States. They received second place in this Chinese version of America's Got Talent.

Their 2019 single Snap! featured the pianist Robert Glasper and singer Grace Weber. The actor Terry Crews starred in the associated clip.

During the COVID-19 pandemic, the Potash Twins decided to settle down in Palm Springs, California to finish their latest album. With Hornography, which means study of horn music, released in 2022, the Potash Twins try to answer the question where do horns fit. They decided to incorporate spoken word moments on their music from some of their mentors Terry Crews, chef Andrew Zimmern, Vanderpump Rules actress Katie Maloney, Bob Saget, and also musically features Grammy Award winners Robert Glasper, Cory Wong, and Jazz Cartier. Bob Saget recorded his part before his death at age 65 in January. In 2018, Adeev and Ezra had a family member diagnosed with the autoimmune disease scleroderma. It is the same disease that took the life of Saget's older sister Gay in 1994. Saget helped them during this period. A portion of the album proceeds are going to the Scleroderma Research Foundation in his honor.

== Television career ==
The brothers are the proteges of celebrity chef and TV personality Andrew Zimmern. Zimmern has been the executive producer of their television shows to date. From 2017 to 2018, the series Southern Road Trip with The Potash Twins follows Adeev and Ezra Potash on a culinary and cultural journey through the American South.

Beats + Bites (2018–2019) featured the Potash Twins travelling with musical collaborators and visiting food venues. Among the guests, there were pairing like jazz artist Wynton Marsalis with Top Chef Michael Voltaggio and hip hop artist Smino with Top Chef judge Tom Colicchio. The show explored the intersection of music and food.

In 2021, throughout ten episodes of Takeout Twins, the Twins cook dishes such as margherita pizza, pad thai and butter chicken for guests such as Joel McHale, Rob Riggle, Sheila E., Musiq Soulchild, Andrew Zimmern.

In addition to hosting their own television series, the Potash Twins have made guest appearances on a range of national television programs, including Impractical Jokers, Good Morning America, The Tamron Hall Show, The Kelly Clarkson Show, The Rachael Ray Show, Ridiculousness, and appearances on the Hallmark Channel, as well as other entertainment and lifestyle programming across major U.S. networks.

Since 2022, Ezra and Adeev have participated in the Big Slick Celebrity Weekend, an annual Kansas City fundraiser benefiting Children's Mercy Hospital. The event is hosted by Kansas City-area performers, Paul Rudd, Jason Sudeikis, Rob Riggle, Eric Stonestreet, Heidi Gardner, and David Koechner.

== Composition and soundtrack work ==
They have written and composed music for the Emmy Award winning shows RuPaul's Drag Race, RuPaul's Drag Race UK and Sherman's Showcase. They contributed trumpet and trombone performances to the soundtrack of the film Better Man, with Adeev credited as a trumpeter and Ezra as a trombonist. The film’s soundtrack album later reached number one on the UK Albums Chart.

In 2025, the twins performed on tracks for Walt Disney Records’ compilation Music from Disneyland Resort 70th Celebration, including “Celebrate Happy” by the Jonas Brothers and “Makes Me Wanna Move” by Fitz and the Tantrums.

== Other ventures ==
In 2025, the Potash Twins co-founded the candy company Sweet Stash with actor Martin Starr. Produced in Albion, Nebraska, the company’s flagship product “Jams”—gummy candies shaped like music notes—launched in more than 150 retail locations across Nebraska and neighboring states. The national debut took place at Samuel’s Sweet Shop in Rhinebeck, New York, where actor Paul Rudd, a co-owner of the store and a friend of the twins, participated in the launch event. Their entrepreneurial turn and the story behind Sweet Stash were later profiled in The New Yorker.

== Television shows ==
Year(s)	Television Show	Network	Ref(s)
2017-2018	Southern Road Trip with The Potash Twins	Travel Channel	
2018-2019	Beats + Bites with The Potash Twins	Bravo	
2021–Present	Takeout Twins	Food Network	

== Discography ==
Year	Singles	Featured Artist	Ref
2019	Snap!	Grace Weber & Robert Glasper	

Year	Extended Plays	Producers	Ref(s)
2012	Twintuition	N/A	
2015	The Potash Twins	Cory Wong & Steven Greenberg	
2022	Hornography	N/A	

== Honors ==
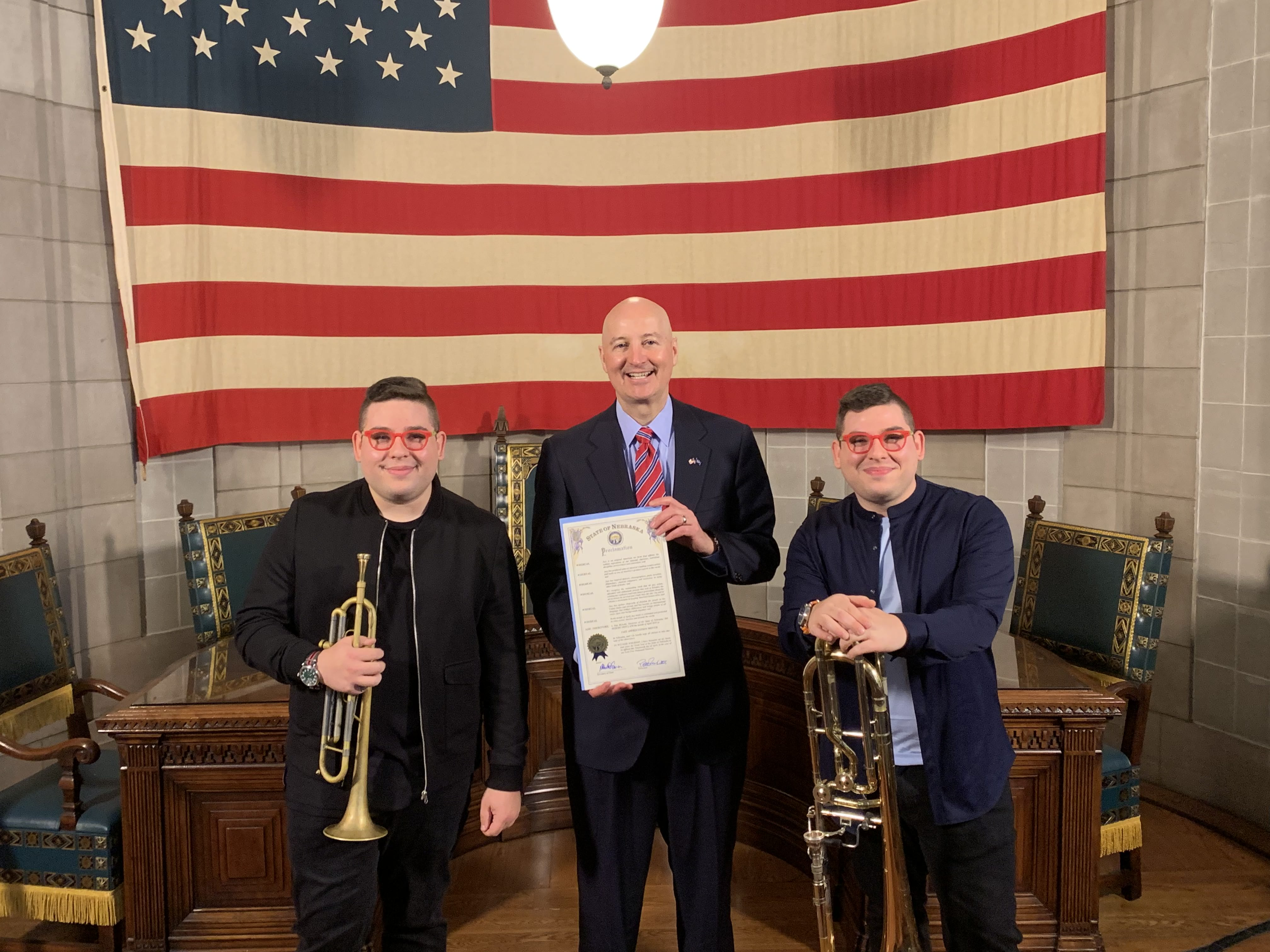
Gov. Pete Ricketts with Ezra & Adeev

- Nebraska:
  - Awarded the rank of Nebraska Admiral by Governor Pete Ricketts in 2016.
  - Named the Cultural Ambassadors of the State of Nebraska by proclamation in 2019.
- Texas:
  - 'Honorary Texans' by order of Governor Rick Perry in 2006.
