= List of museums and cultural institutions in Omaha, Nebraska =

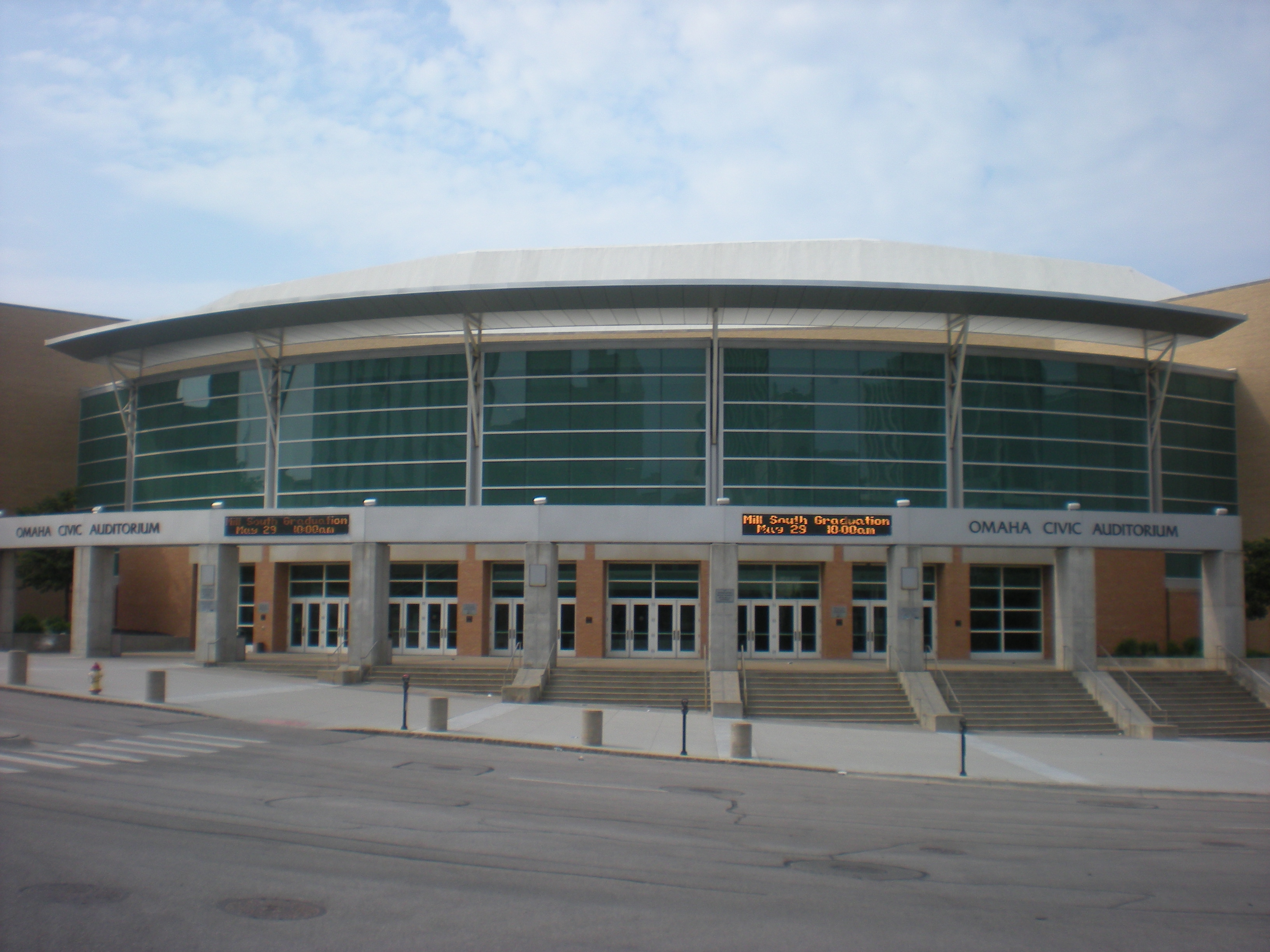
Omaha Civic Auditorium

There are many cultural institutions and museums in Omaha, Nebraska. The city has a major museum, and several regionally important museums.

== Museums ==
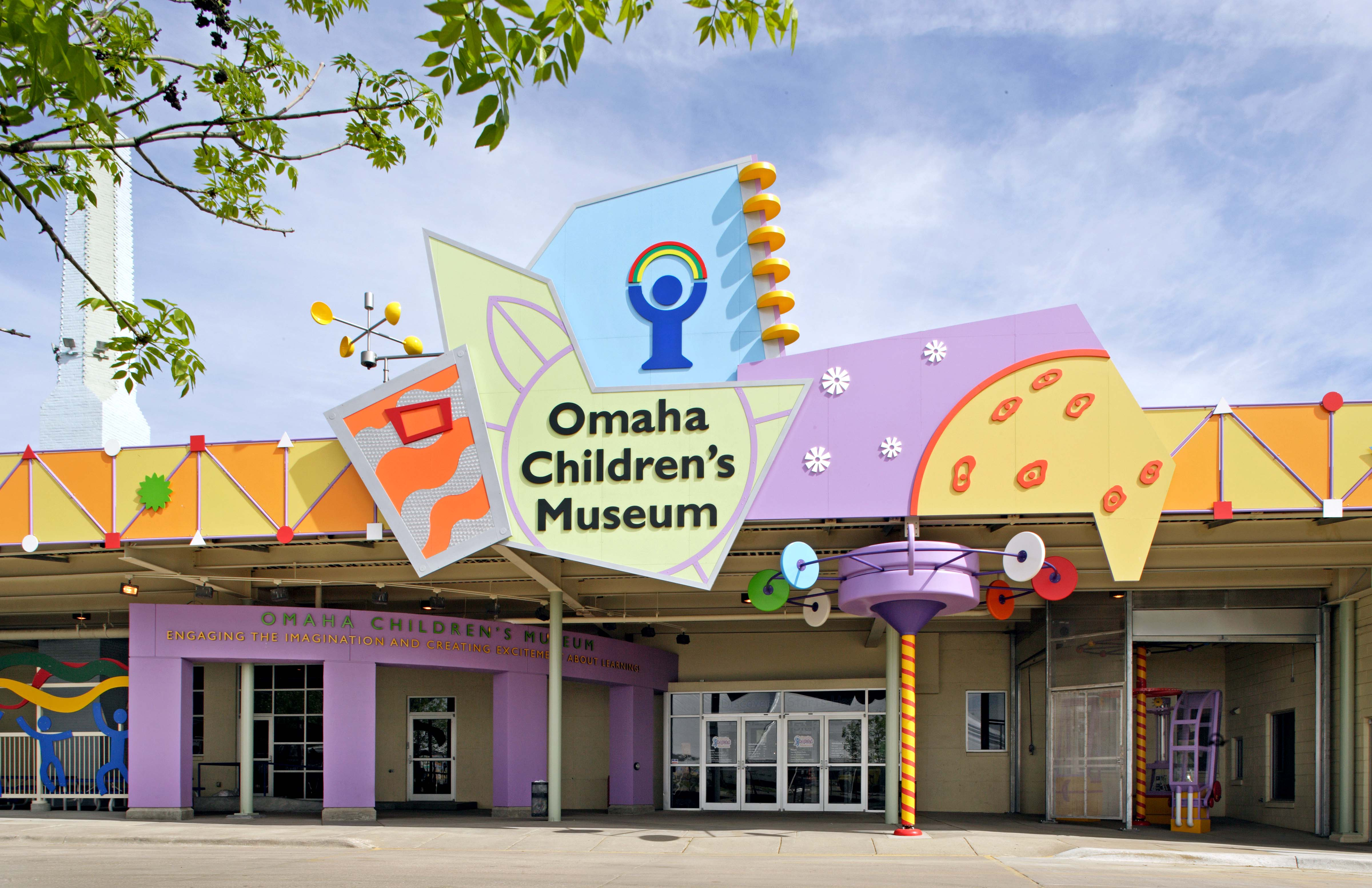
Omaha Children's Museum

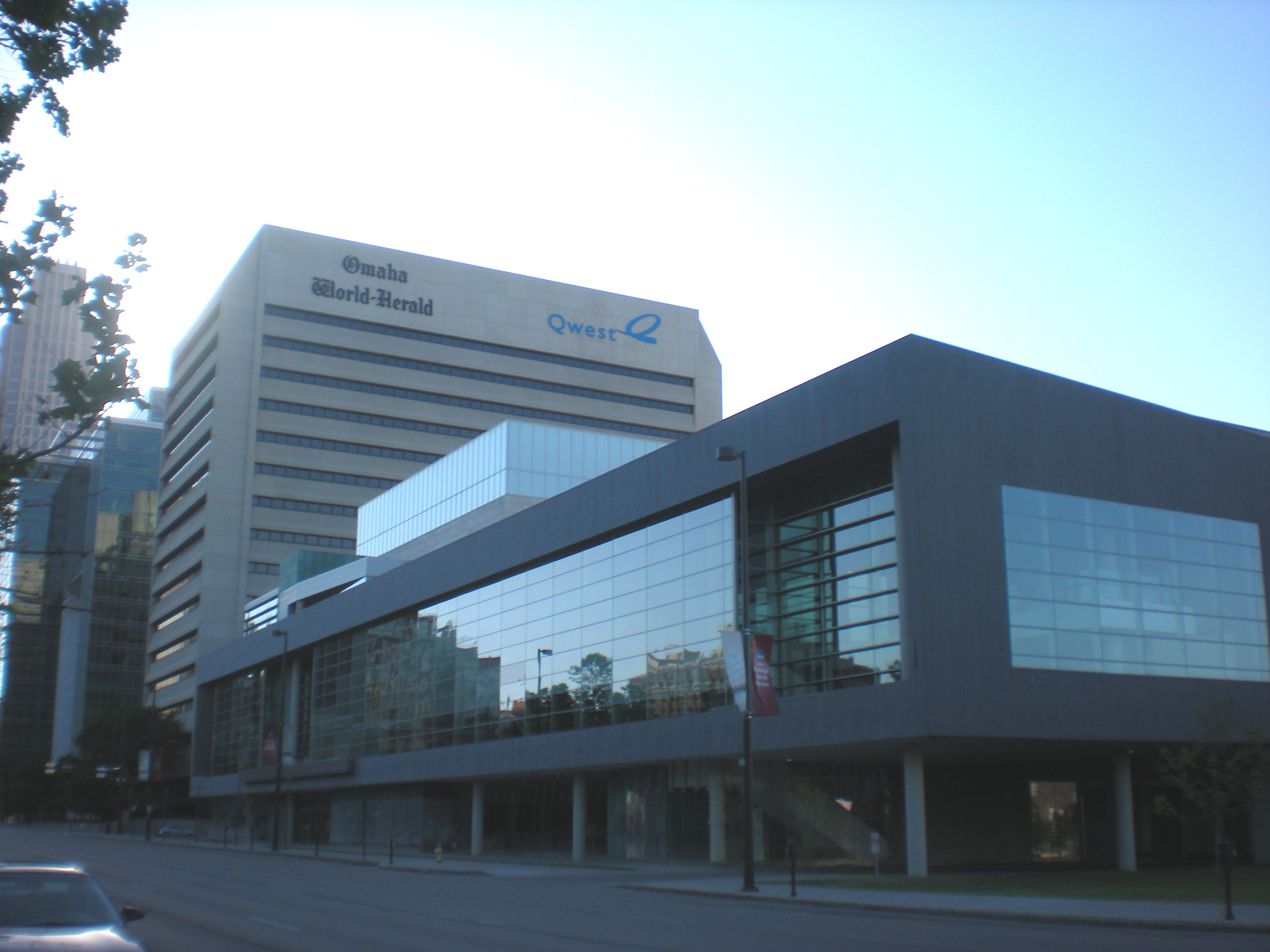
Holland Performing Arts Center

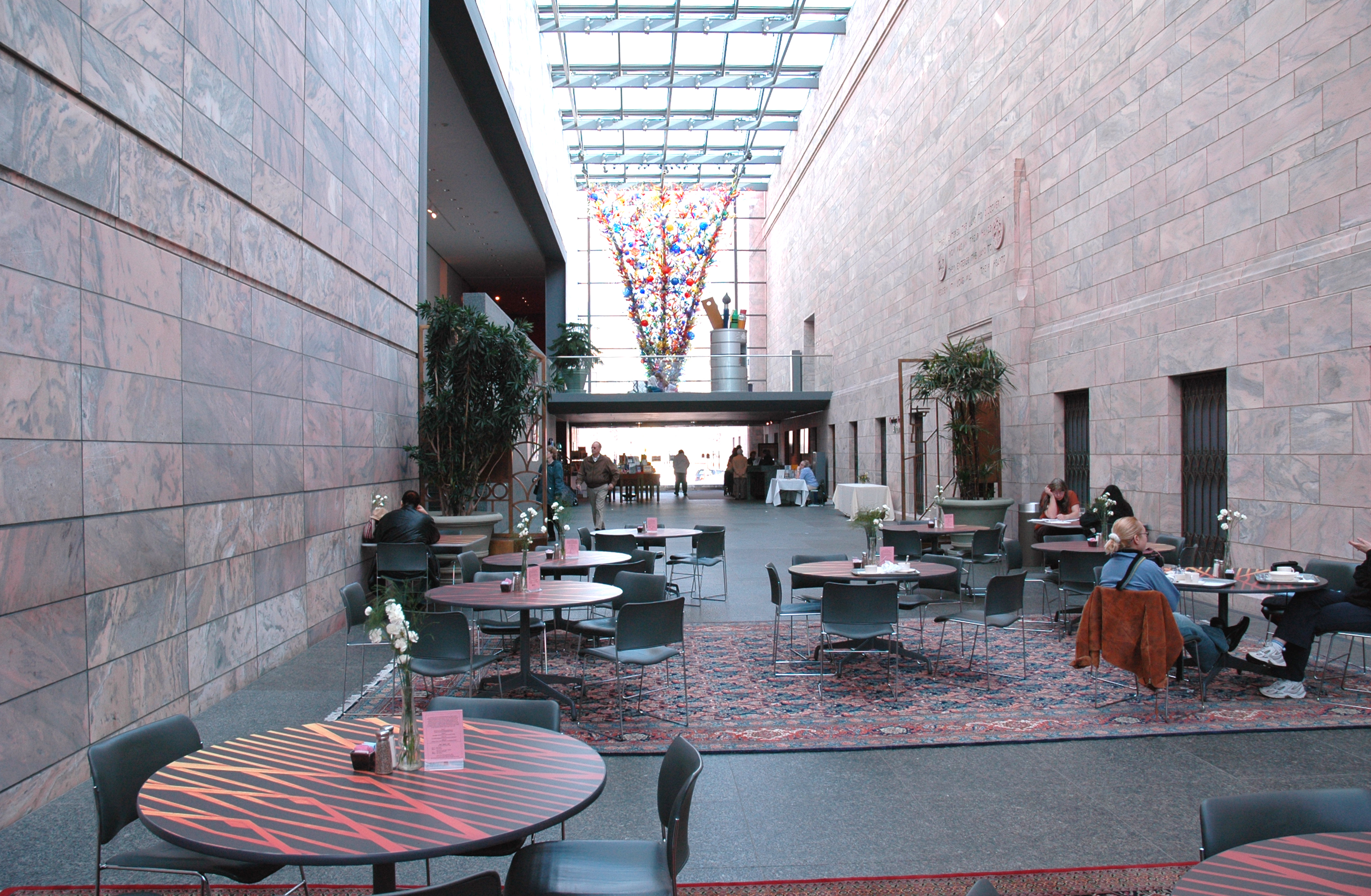
The atrium of the Joslyn Art Museum. Dale Chihuly's Chihuly: Inside and Out can be seen at the far end.

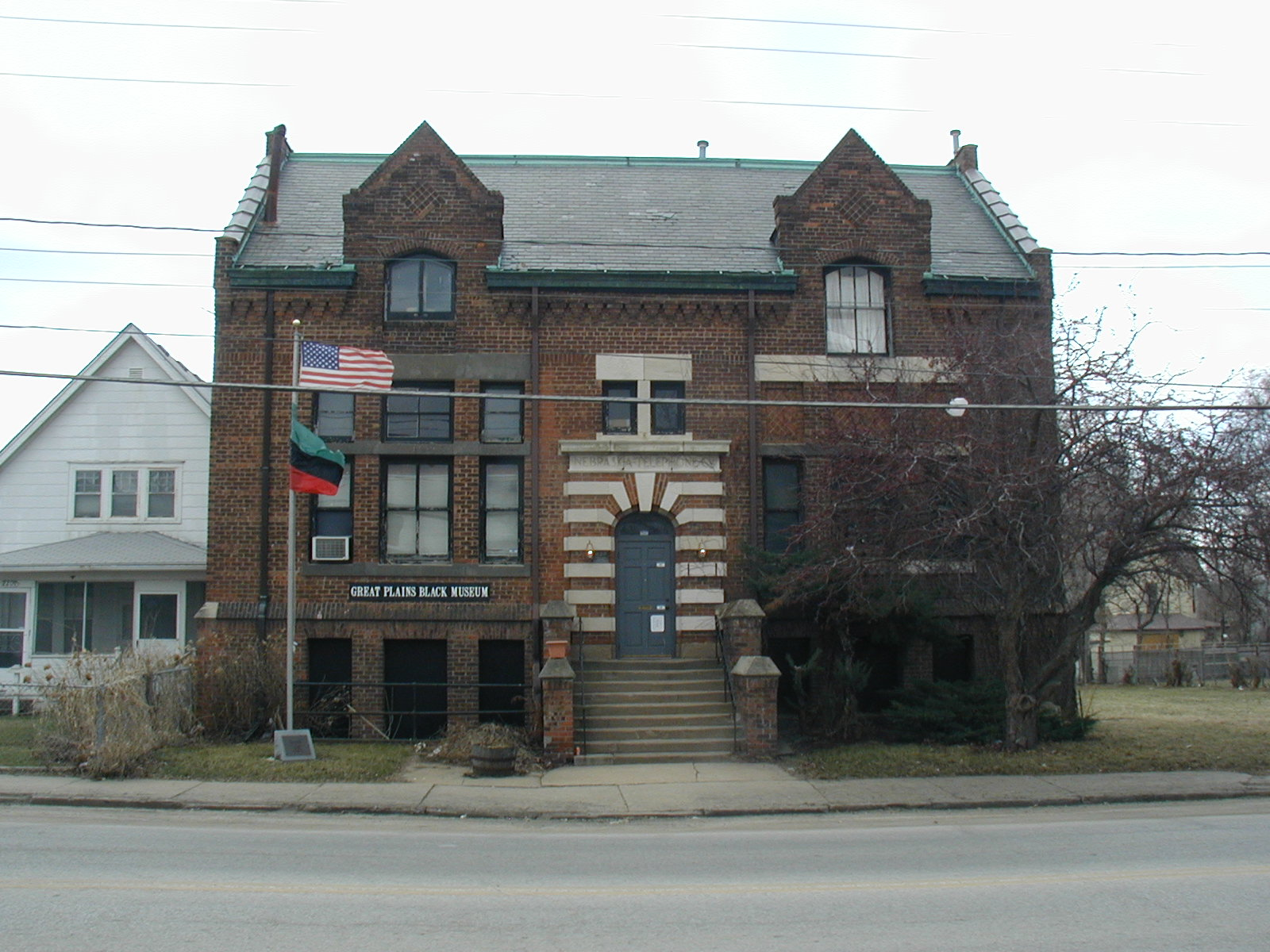
Great Plains Black History Museum

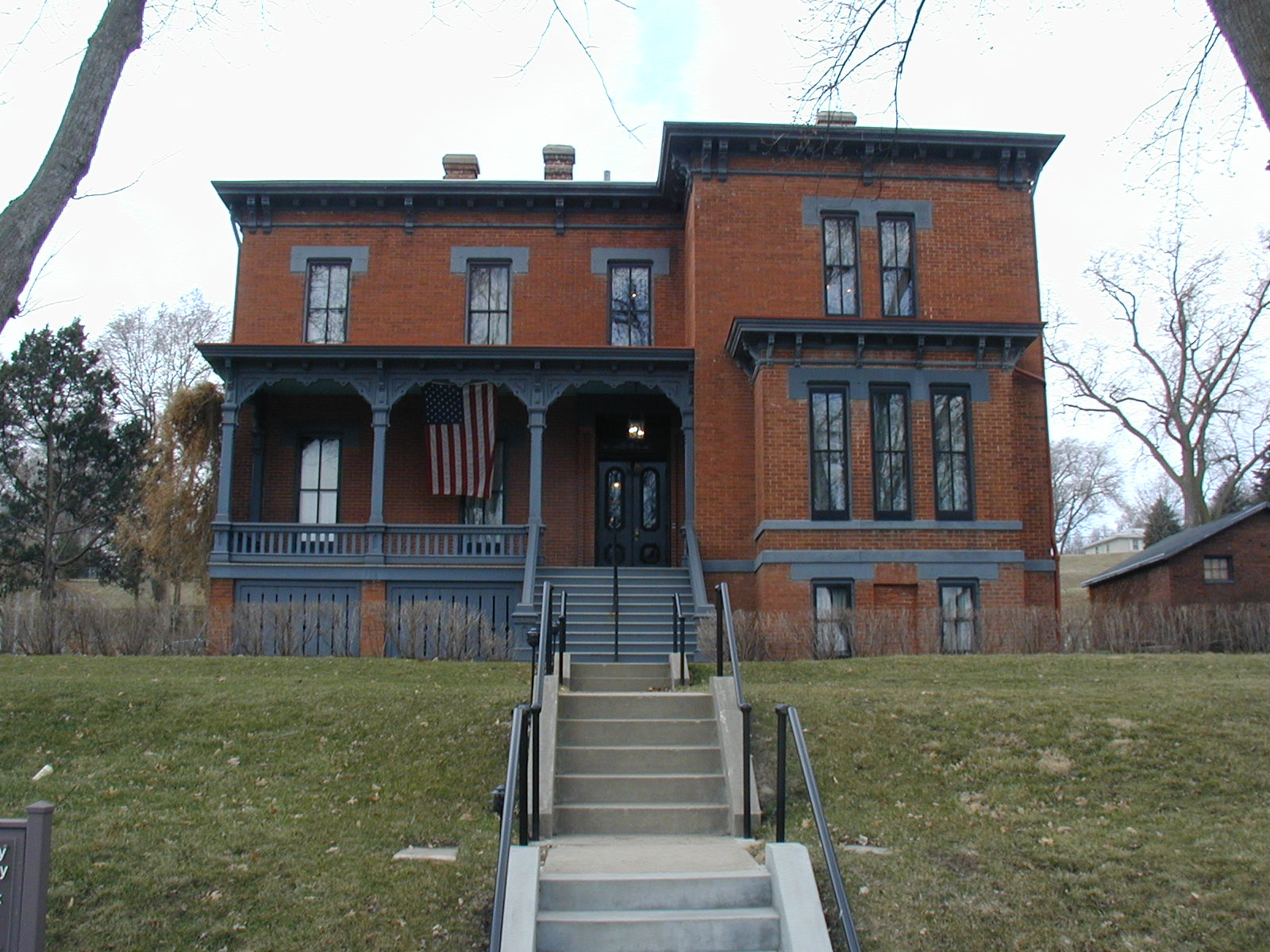
General Crook House Museum

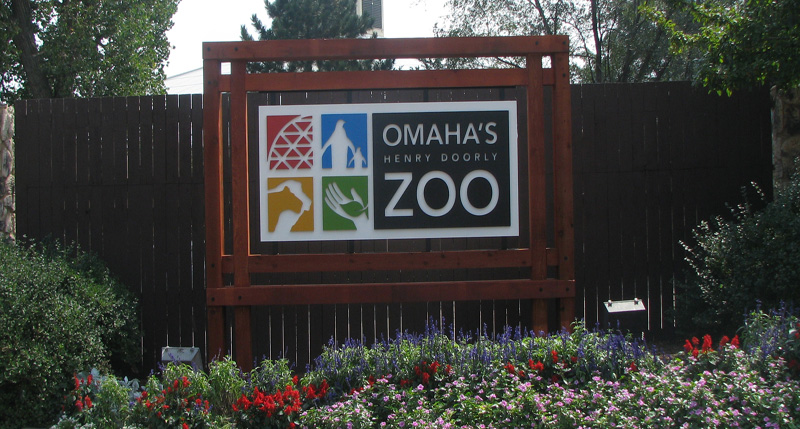
Omaha's Henry Doorly Zoo

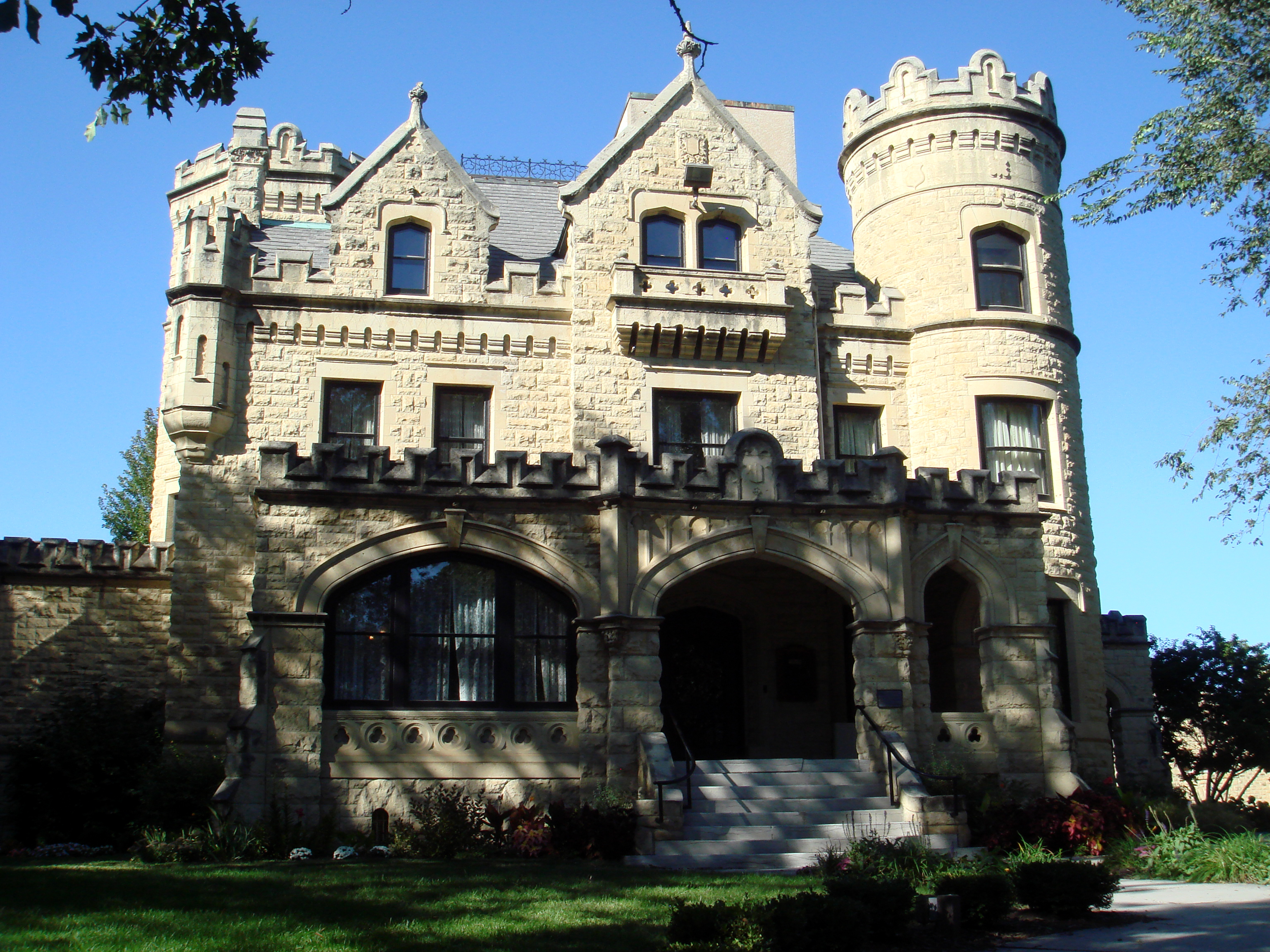
Joslyn Castle

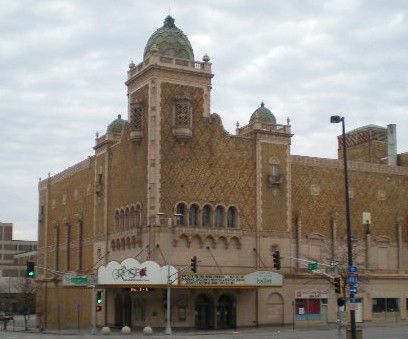
Rose Theatre

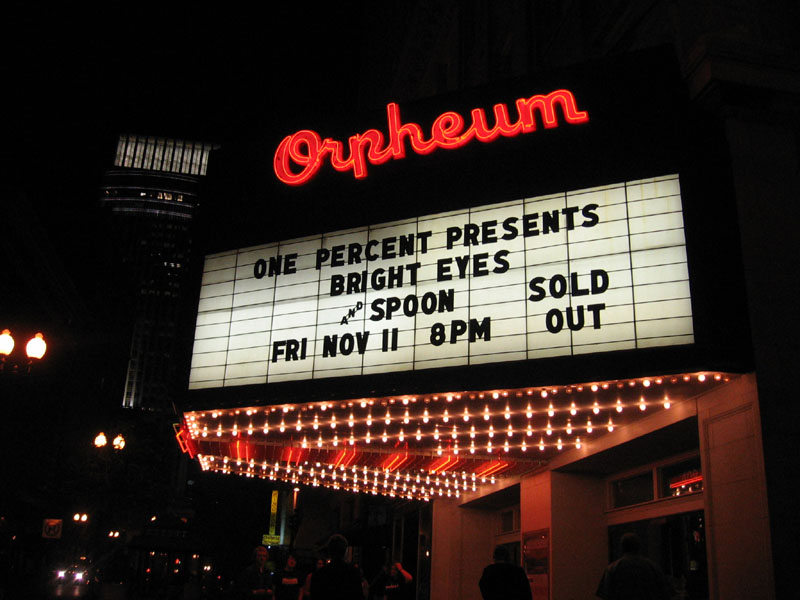
Orpheum Theatre

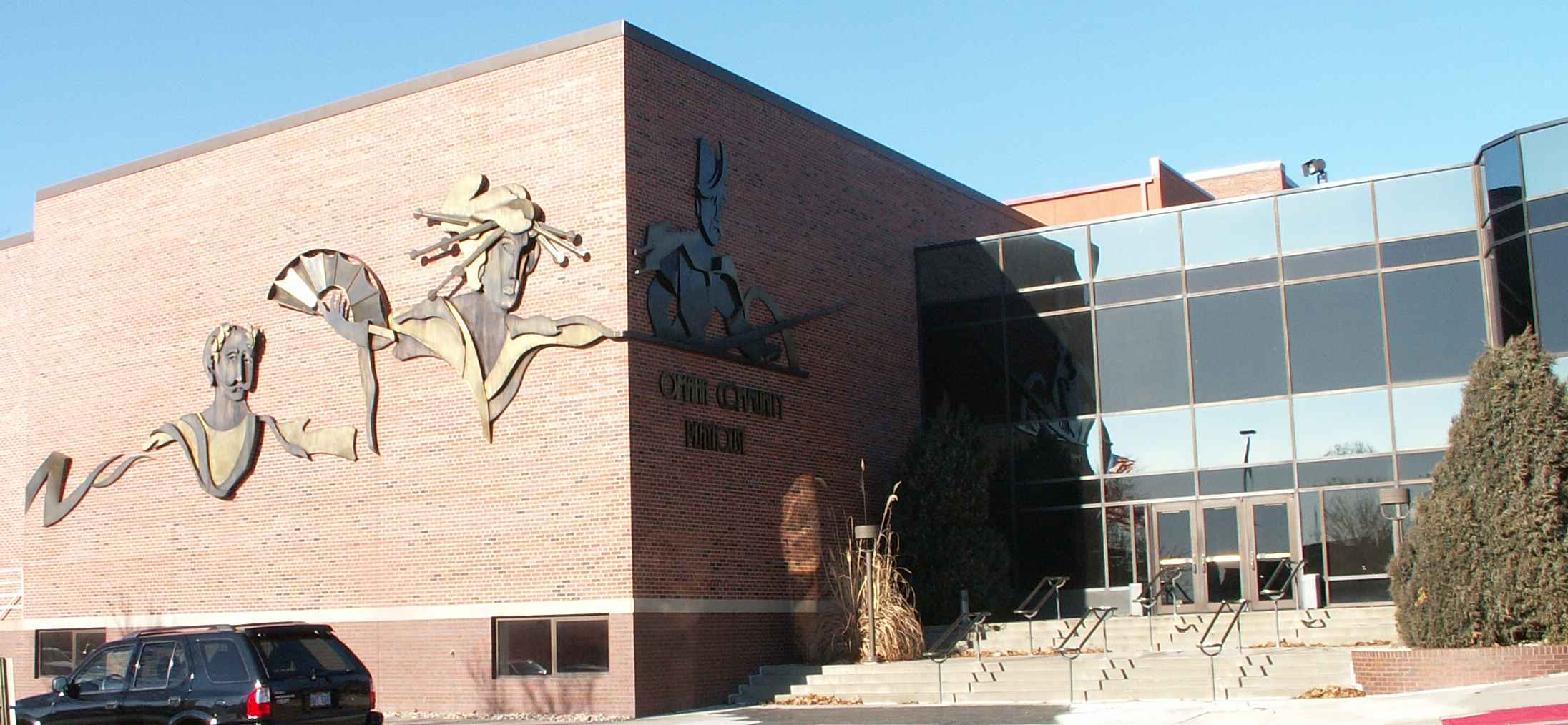
Omaha Community Playhouse

=== Art ===
- The Bemis Center for Contemporary Arts, just south of Omaha's Old Market Historic District, was founded in the early 1980s and plays host to artists from all over the world. It is one of the nation's premier artists' colonies.
- Bemis was co-founded by Ree Kaneko, wife of famed Japanese American artist Jun Kaneko. They live in Omaha, and opened a museum called The Kaneko in 2007.
- Samuel Bak Museum: The Learning Center opened at the University of Nebraska at Omaha in February 2023. The museum holds over 500 paintings by Lithuanian American artist and Holocaust survivor Samuel Bak.

=== Art (encyclopedic collection) ===
- The Joslyn Art Museum is nationally renowned for its collections of Native American art and art works relating to the early European exploration of western North America.

=== Botanic conservatory ===
- Lauritzen Gardens, Omaha's Botanical Center

=== Children's ===
- Since its inception in 1976, Omaha Children's Museum has been a place where children can challenge themselves, discover how the world works and learn through play.
- The Kiewit Luminarium, a science museum on Omaha's riverfront, is scheduled to open in April 2023.

=== Cultural ===
- Sokol South Omaha Czechoslovak Museum
- El Museo Latino celebrates the legacy, art and culture of Latin America, and is the first Latino art and history museum in Omaha.
- The Great Plains Black History Museum, celebrating the legacy of African Americans in Omaha and throughout the Great Plains.
- Henry and Dorothy Riekes Museum, located at the Staenberg Kooper Fellman Campus of the Jewish Federation of Omaha

=== History ===
- The Durham Museum is located on 10th Street in the art deco Union Station. The museum has numerous permanent exhibits and is accredited with the Smithsonian Institution for traveling exhibits from the Smithsonian.

=== Specialized and historical ===
- Bank of Florence Museum
- Batchelder Family Scout Museum
- Boys Town Hall of History
- Florence Depot
- Florence Mill
- Freedom Park Navy Museum
- The General Crook House Museum at Fort Omaha, exploring the role of the U.S. Army during the Indian Wars of the 1900s, is part of the Douglas County Historical Society.
- Gerald R. Ford Birthsite and Gardens
- Joslyn Castle
- Lewis and Clark National Historic Trail Headquarters and Visitor Center
- Mormon Trail Center at Historic Winter Quarters
- Nebraska School for the Deaf Museum
- Omaha Black Music Hall of Fame
- Omaha Home for Boys Visitors Center History Museum
- Trinity Cathedral Historical Society

=== Zoological ===
- Fontenelle Forest
- Henry Doorly Zoo
- Lee G. Simmons Conservation Park and Wildlife Safari

== Libraries ==
- Omaha Public Library
- University Libraries, University of Nebraska Omaha

== Festivals and fairs ==
- Maha Music Festival
- Native Omaha Days
- Omaha Blues, Jazz, & Gospel Festival
- Red Sky Music Festival

== Music, theater and performing arts ==
- Astro Theater
- CHI Health Center Omaha
- Cog Factory
- Creighton Orpheum Theater
- Holland Performing Arts Center
- Omaha Civic Auditorium
- Omaha Community Playhouse
- Sokol Underground

=== Dance ===
- Omaha Academy of Ballet
- The Rose

=== Opera ===
- Opera Omaha

=== Recording studios ===
- Saddle Creek Records

=== Symphony ===
- Omaha Symphony Orchestra

=== Theater ===
- Blue Barn Theatre
- Magic Theatre
- Shelterbelt Theatre

== Not-for-profit and university galleries ==
- John Beasley Theater
- Loves Jazz and Arts Center

== See also ==
- Culture of Omaha, Nebraska
- List of museums in Nebraska
