= Naparex =

Logistics and courier company

NAPAREX
- Company type: Private
- Industry: Logistics
- Headquarters: Omaha, Nebraska
- Area served: Worldwide
- Website: www.naparex.com

NAPAREX, LLC, is a National Logistics services company, based in the United States. The name "NAPAREX" is a syllabic abbreviation of the name of the company's services, National Parcel Express.

== Overview ==
NAPAREX is a venture among several industry veterans. Formed with a concept to utilize existing networks of information and logistics in 2008, NAPAREX is a logistics and delivery company working with same day courier companies around the globe. With over 250 agents, representing over 5,000 employee and contractor drivers, NAPAREX is a company to provide same day delivery services to business and consumers utilizing existing networks.

== History ==
Founded by Capital Express, NAPAREX begun utilizing the delivery network established by Capital, located in Omaha, Nebraska. Capital Express is a regional logistics company servicing nine mid-western states.

Until January 1, 2009, NAPAREX provided domestic services in the United States and on this date, NAPAREX became International.

== Transportation ==
NAPAREX utilizes almost every possible means of travel. Trains and Ships are the two methods that are never used, as their speed of travel is too slow for the same day shipper.

Bike messengers, cars, pick up trucks, cargo vans, straight trucks, box trucks, transport trucks and air is preferred vehicles for most couriers, including NAPAREX.

== See also ==
- Courier Service
- Package delivery
