= Pinnacle Bancorp =

Bank holding company headquartered in Omaha, Nebraska, USA

- Type: Privately held company
- Industry: Financial services
- Founded: 1938; 88 years ago
- Founder: George Dinsdale
- Headquarters: Omaha, Nebraska, United States
- Number of locations: 160 (2023)
- Area served: Nebraska and surrounding states
- Key people: Sid Dinsdale (chairman), Mark Hesser (president)
- Products: Banking services through subsidiaries. agricultural lending
- Number of employees: 2,216 (2026)
- Subsidiaries: Pinnacle Bank
- Website: www.pinnbank.com

Pinnacle Bancorp is an American bank holding company headquartered in Omaha, Nebraska. As of 2023, it had $18.7 billion in assets with 160 locations in eight states. In 2015, its Pinnacle Bank subsidiary was the eighth-largest agricultural lender in the United states.

== History ==
George Dinsdale of Palmer, Nebraska, a farmer and rancher, started Palmer State Bank in 1938. George Dinsdale's sons Roy and Jack bought a second bank in Neligh, Nebraska in 1959 and later started banks in Nebraska, Colorado, Kansas and Wyoming. George Dinsdale's grandson John S. "Sid" Dinsdale became president of Pinnacle Bancorp in 1994. Sid Dinsdale said the company grew using a community bank model, with local presidents of individual banks making local decisions.

Havelock Bank, with 6 Lincoln locations, became a part of Pinnacle in 1994 and became Pinnacle bank in 1998.

In 1996 Pinnacle Bank Omaha gave the company its first Omaha locations. The Omaha operation would be part of Pinnacle Bank of Papillion, previously called Bank of Papillion. At the time, Pinnacle Bancorp had $1.5 billion in assets, 24 bank charters and 40 locations in mostly small towns in Nebraska, Colorado, Kansas and Wyoming. Lincoln, Nebraska was its largest market. The holding company was based in Central City, Nebraska.

In 1999, construction began on a $1.8 million operations center in Gretna, Nebraska.

Also in 1999, Pinnacle applied to combine the charters of its Palmer and Central City banks with its Papillion bank.

On July 3, 2002, Pinnacle Bank of Central City, Nebraska announced its acquisition of Beatrice National Bank and Trust Co. and the Wymore State Bank, giving the bank close to $3 billion in assets in Nebraska, Colorado, Kansas, New Mexico and Wyoming.

As of 2010 Pinnacle Bancorp was the second-largest bank holding company in Nebraska, with four banks. The company had $5.5 billion in assets and 110 offices, 51 in Nebraska, 13 in Texas, five in Kansas and one in Wyoming. Bank of Colorado had 37 locations in Colorado and three in New Mexico.

Groundbreaking took place for a new three-story headquarters for the bank on May 12, 2010, northwest of 180th Street and West Dodge Road.

Pinnacle Bank announced December 6, 2011 that it would pay $11.25 million for naming rights for 25 years on an arena scheduled to open in 2013 in Lincoln. The holding company had $6.3 billion in assets with 121 locations in eight states, 53 in Nebraska.

On October 10, 2012, Pinnacle Bank agreed to buy First State Bank of Joplin, Missouri, with $183 million in assets and six branches. This gave Pinnacle a total of 57 branches, and seven in Missouri, where the bank previously had one branch.

On July 10, 2014, Pinnacle Bancorp announced Mark Hesser, previously head of the company's Nebraska unit, would succeed Sid Dinsdale as president. At the time, Pinnacle was the state's third-largest bank holding company, with 5 percent of deposits. In the previous 18 months, the company had taken over three banks, one each in Nebraska, Missouri and Colorado, with 11 locations. The company had $7.6 billion in assets and 130 locations in eight states.

As of 2015, Pinnacle Bank, based in Lincoln, was the fourth-largest Nebraska-based bank and the country's eighth-largest farm lender, with about $1.6 billion in agricultural loans as of the second quarter.

As of 2023, Pinnacle had $18.7 billion in assets and 160 locations in eight states, 66 of them in Nebraska. Sid Dinsdale was still the chairman, and Hesser was president.
