= Sweet Stash =

American candy company

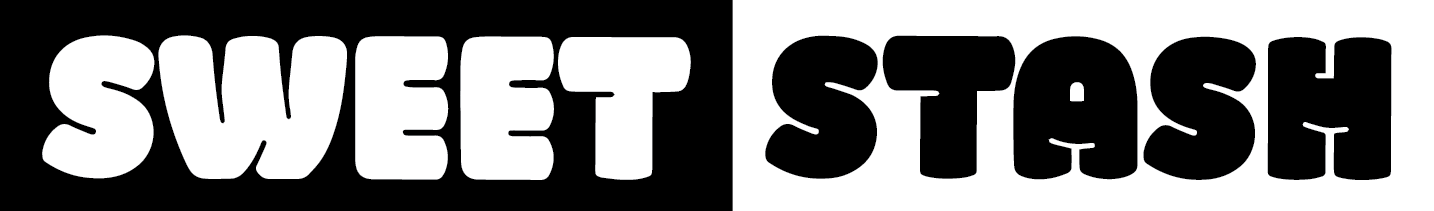
- Official logo
- Industry: Confectionery
- Founded: 2025
- Headquarters: Omaha, Nebraska, United States
- Key people: Martin Starr, the Potash Twins
- Products: Gummy candy
- Website: sweetstash.com

Sweet Stash is an American candy company founded in 2025 by musicians Ezra and Adeev Potash and actor Martin Starr. Based in Omaha, Nebraska, the company produces gummy candies shaped like music notes. "Stash" in Sweet Stash is a portmanteau of co-founders Martin Starr and the Potash Twins’ surnames (“Starr” and “Potash”). The gummies were initially produced in Albion, Nebraska.

== History ==
The founders of Sweet Stash met at the Big Slick Celebrity Weekend, an annual fundraising event benefiting Children's Mercy Hospital in Kansas City. Development of the product involved collaboration with food scientist Tessa Porter, formerly of Ferrara Candy Company, who helped refine the product's texture and formulation. Porter noted that Jams have "the most complex flavor profile" she has worked with in any gummy product. The New Yorker described the gummies as influenced by Swedish and Japanese confectionery traditions. The packaging was designed by Ellen Van Dusen, founder of the design studio Dusen Dusen.

Sweet Stash has stated that a portion of profits will be allocated to support arts education, including programs in music, theater, film, and related creative disciplines. In a 2025 interview with KETV, co-founder Ezra Potash announced a partnership between Sweet Stash and Omaha Performing Arts to support educational programming in music and theater in Nebraska. Sweet Stash products are sold at concessions in the Holland Performing Arts Center and the Orpheum Theater (Omaha), and a portion of the company’s profits support Omaha Performing Arts initiatives.

The first retail location to carry Sweet Stash Jams was Samuel’s Sweet Shop in Rhinebeck, New York, co-owned by actors Paul Rudd, Hilarie Burton Morgan, and Jeffrey Dean Morgan. The Sweet Stash founders and Samuel’s owners collaborated on a launch event in July 2025. As of October 2025, Sweet Stash is stocked in over 150 stores across Nebraska, surrounding states, and New York.
