= MultiMechanics =

Simulation software company

- Company type: Private
- Industry: CAE Software
- Founded: 2010
- Headquarters: Omaha, Nebraska
- Website: Official website

MultiMechanics is a software company based in Omaha, NE. Their flagship product, MultiMech, is a multiscale finite element simulation package used for the structural analysis of advanced materials.

The company was founded in 2010 by Flavio Souza and Leandro Castro.

MultiMechanics is part of the Altair Hyperworks Partner Alliance, the Ansys App Store, and the Dassault Systèmes Partner Program. The company was named the DesktopEngineering.com "Pick of the Week" in 2016 and the Nebraska Business Development Center’s Technology Company of the Year in 2011.
