= Christopher Reutinger =

American musician

Christopher Reutinger with his violin

Christopher Reutinger (born September 10, 1946 in San Diego, California) is an American musician, composer, arranger, appraiser of fine string instruments, author, and teacher. He is a violinist.

Reutinger began to study music composition at the age of seven with his English mother Joan Reutinger, 5th cousin of Lady Diana Spencer and a famous Berkeley and San Diego concert pianist. At the age of nine, he began to study violin, and by the age of 12 his compositions were being performed by the San Diego Symphony. In 1957 the San Diego Symphony performed his original composition: "18th Century", and the following year, in 1958, the San Diego Symphony orchestra debuted his original composition "Gigue". His senior year at Point Loma High School, he was selected to be the Concertmaster of the San Diego All City's High School Orchestra in 1964.

Reutinger won a full scholarship to San Francisco State University to be part of the school's flagship music ensemble The Morrison Quartet. The quartet appeared on San Francisco local KPIX CBS every Sunday in the show: "Molnar on Music" hosted by the renowned violist Frenrick Molnar. He also studied with Naoum Blinder pupil and San Francisco Symphony Concertmaster Fank Houser. Transferring to the University of California at Berkeley he studied composition with Roger Sessions before graduating in 1970. Because of student unrest at SF State and Berkeley, when his parents wanted him to return home, Chris became the Father of California Street Music in 1969 for survival. He was the first to play classical violin in the streets of San Francisco, San Diego, and Los Angeles before anyone else and was written up in Rolling Stone Magazine as such. During this period he also performed with the Oakland Symphony. As a graduate student at the Thornton School of Music at the University of Southern California, Reutinger studied violin with renowned violinist Alice Schoenfeld. He was also asked by conductor Daniel Lewis to be part of the elite USC String Orchestra.

Winning an audition to be a first violinist with the Honolulu Symphony in 1972, he spent one season in Hawaii before returning to Los Angeles to begin a career in live performances and studio recordings. To date, he has contributed to over 550 motion pictures scores and over 450 record/CDs. He has recorded and performed with Elton John, Barry Manilow, Henry Mancini, Frank Sinatra, Sammy Davis Jr., Roy Orbison where he appears as the bearded violinist on the Cinemax TV Special "Black and White Night", Ray Charles, Diana Ross, Lionel Richie, Beck, Natalie Cole, Andrea Bocelli, Jewel, and Michael Feinstein, to name a few. Reutinger was a founding member of the Hollywood Bowl Orchestra conducted by John Mauceri. He has performed with numerous other symphonies. Chris also trained actors for TV and the big screen. He trained British Actor Simon Templeman to fake violin on screen for 4 episodes of "Northern Exposure," and was the on screen finger double. He trained a 5 year old Makenzie Vega (daughter to The Good Wife TV Show) to perform violin on screen for the Nicolas Cage film, "Family Man." In the early 90s he composed 22 "source Tunes," for Warner Brothers TV and Movies. His most used tune: "Vivaldi Gets Lucky," appears on Walker, Texas Ranger, and other movies of the week. His string arrangement for "Silverplated" and his violin/viola performances appear on Granite Records recording artist Geoff Byrd's new CD: "Shrinking Violets". Reutinger recently composed and performed the music to accompany the interpretive dances for the prototype for "Artists for Trauma", a non-profit founded by Laura T.Sharpe of "The Laura Project". To view the video enter Artists For Trauma Project in the google search engine.

== Filmography ==
Addams Family Values — Air America — Aladdin — All of Me — American Tail 3—Amos & Andrew-Another Stakeout — Another You — Baby's Day Out — Back to The Beach — Back to The Future 2—Back to The Future 3—Beauty and The Beast — Bingo — Black Rain — Blind Date — Body Double — Brain Donors — Buddy Buddy — The Champ — Chances Are — A Change of Season — Chapter Two — Chrome Soldiers — Cleopatra Jones & The Casino of Gold — Clifford — Condorman — Cool Runnings-Corvette Summer — Crazy People — Cry Baby — Curly Sue — Deceived — Delirious — Demolition Man — Edward Sissorhands — Everybody's All-American — Family Man — The Favor — Fear — Fire And Rain — Flight of The Intruder — Foodfight-For Love or Money — Frankie and Johnny — Free Willy — Geronimo: An American Legend — Get Smart Movie — Ghost — Ghost Dad — Godzilla — A Goofy Movie — Grand Canyon — The Great Mouse Detective — The Great Outdoors — Grumpy Old Men — Grumpier Old Men — H.E. Double Hockeysticks — Harry and Son — Heat Wave — Hero at Large — Hide in Plain Sight — Hocus Pocus — Holy Matrimony — Homeward Bound — Honey I Blew Up The Kids — Hot Shots 2—Hunchback of Notre Dame — I Spy Movie — Invasion of The Body Snatchers(78')--The Jetsons Movie — Josh and Sam — Last Action Hero — Last of The Mohicans — A League of Their Own — A Life in The Theater — Lion King 2—Little Big League — Little Nilita — Logans Run — Look Who's Talking Too — Love and Bullets Charlie — Mac and Me — Man Who Loved Women — Married to It — Marvin and Tige — Maybe Baby — McHale's Navy — Meet Joe Black — Men Don't Leave — Meteor — Meteor Man — Micki and Maude — Miles From Home — Moment by Moment(78)--Mommie Dearest — Moscow on The Hudson — The Mountain Men — The Muppet Movie — My Favorite Year — My Stepmother is An Alien — Narrow Margin — Never Forget — Newsies — Next of Kin — Nightmare on The 13th. Floor — Nightwing — Once Upon a Crime — The Other Side of The Mountain 2—Pennies From Heaven(81)--A Perfect World — The Personals — Physical Evidence — Pocahontas — Point Break — Police Academy 5—Police Academy 7—Primary Colors — Pure Country — Quest For Camelot — Quigley Down Under — The Rapture — Ratboy — Return to The Blue Lagoon — Roman Holiday(87)--Ruby Bridges — S.O.B.--Sea of Love — The Seduction of Gina — She's Having a Baby — Shiloh — Silverado — Skin Deep — Space Cowboys — Spaceballs-Star Trek 5—Stay Tuned — Steel — Stella — Stick — Sunset — Sweet Dreams — Swing Shift — Switch — Switching Channels —TED- Telefon — That's Dancing — That's Entertainment 2—That's Entertainment 3—That's Life — Time Cop — The Toy — Tremors — True Identity — Unfaithfully Yours — Violets Are Blue — Walk Proud — Welcome Home — When Time Ran Out — White Fang — White Fang 2—Who'll Stop

== Television ==
The Cleveland Show

- King of the Hill
- Family Guy
- American Dad!
- Chips---Falcon Crest
- Sanford and Son
- Starsky and Hutch
- Cagney and Lacey
- Hotel
- Battlestar Galactica
- Family
- Dallas
- Fame
- Murphy Brown
- The San Pedro Beach Bums
- BL Stryker
- Bonanza
- Knott's Landing
- Murder She Wrote
- The Nanny
- L.A.Law
- Magnum P.I.
- Designing Women
- Logan's Run
- Dolphin Cove
- Northern Exposure
- Hill Street Blues
- The Golden Girls
- Tiny Toons
- Frasier
- Star Trek
- Man from Atlantis
- Walker Texas Ranger
- Danielle Steel
- Father Dowling
- Favorite Son (1-3)
- Growing Pains
- Dr. Quinn Medicine Woman
- The West Wing
- Spencer for Hire
- Baywatch
- Columbo
- Riders of The Purple Sage
- Sadat (parts 1&2)
- Winds of War
- War and Remembrance
- Return to Lonesome Dove
- Return to Witch Mountain
- Kaleidoscope
- Mrs. Santa Claus
- The Thornbirds
- Final Days of Richard Nixon

== Appraiser of Fine String Instruments ==
Christopher has appraised Antique String Instruments for State Farm and other insurance companies for over 50 years. He has also been an Expert Appraiser for Antiquities since 1969 and was the Chief Appraiser for The Malibu Surplus Estate Sale Company for ten years. During that time, his appraisals were insured by Lloyd's of London for $1,000,000.

== Tile artist ==
In addition to his music career, Reutinger is a tile artist, with installations around the world.

== Tennis coach ==
Reutinger has coached High School Tennis for more than 14 years. His teams have been award-winning teams from Malibu High School in Malibu, California and Saint Bonaventure High School in Ventura, California.

Coaching Winning High School Tennis by Christopher Reutinger AKA: Coach R
