= Yampolsky =

Yampolsky, Yampolsky, Yampolskiy (Russian: Ямпольский) is a toponymic surname common among Ukrainian Jews that resided in and around the places called Yampol in Ukraine since the times of the Russian Empire. The Lithuanized form is Jampolskis and the Polonized form is Jampolski.

Notable people with the surname include:

- Abram Yampolsky (1890–1956), Soviet classical violinist
- Boris Yampolsky (1912–1972), Russian writer and editor
- Dela Yampolsky (born 1988), Israeli–Nigerian footballer
- Mariana Yampolsky (1925–2002), American-born Mexican photographer
- Miri Yampolsky, Israeli pianist
- Philip Yampolsky (1920–1996), American translator
- Roman Yampolskiy (born 1979 ), Russian computer scientist
- Shachar Yampolsky, Israeli keyboardist, member of Teapacks since 2014
- Victor Yampolsky (born 1942), Russian-born conductor and son of pianist Vladimir Yampolsky
- Vladimir Yampolsky (1905–1965), Russian pianist
