= Nashville Symphony Fashion Show =

American annual fashion show

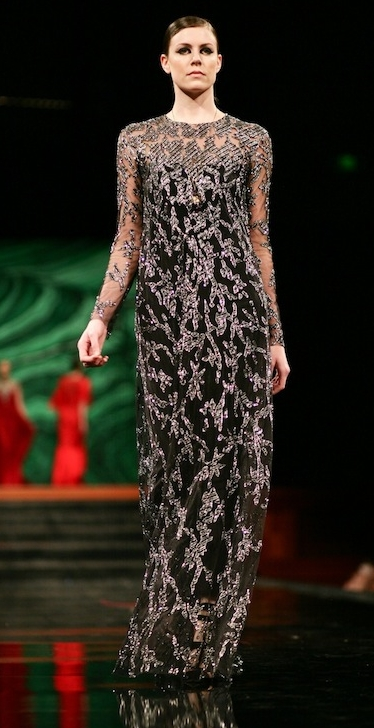
- Model wearing Monique Lhuillier (Nashville Symphony Fashion Show 2013)
- Status: Active
- Genre: Fashion show
- Frequency: Annually
- Venue: Schermerhorn Symphony Center
- Locations: Nashville, Tennessee, United States
- Years active: 19–20
- Inaugurated: 2006
- Sponsor: Nashville Symphony
- Website: Nashville Symphony Fashion Show

The Nashville Symphony Fashion Show started in 2006 to raise awareness and funds in support of the world-renowned Nashville Symphony and its educational and community engagement programs. Past designers have included Carolina Herrera, Brandon Maxwell, Lela Rose, and Monique Lhuillier. Prabal Gurung will headline the 2024 season of the Nashville Symphony Fashion Show with musical performances by Kelleigh Bannen and Brothers Osbourne.

The fashion show has previously featured performances by Karen Elson, Rascal Flatts, Little Big Town, and Neon Jungle.

Year	Designer	Date	Performers
2010	Isaac Mizrahi	April 20, 2010	Little Big Town
2011	Marchesa	April 26, 2011	Faith Hill
2012	Oscar de la Renta	February 28, 2012	Carrie Underwood
2013	Monique Lhuillier	April 9, 2013	Karen Elson
2014	Christian Siriano	April 29, 2014	The Band Perry
2015	Brunello Cucinelli	May 5, 2015	Mandy Barnett
2016	Carolina Herrera	April 26, 2016	
2017	Zac Posen	April 18, 2017	Kelsea Ballerini
2018	Jason Wu	April 17, 2018	Little Big Town
2019	Wes Gordon	May 14, 2019	Lauren Alaina
2020	Zang Toi	April 14, 2020	
2021	Zang Toi	April 28, 2021	Runaway June, Carly Pearce
2022	Lela Rose	April 26, 2022	Jason Aldean
2023	Brandon Maxwell	April 25, 2023	
2024	Prabal Gurung	April 23, 2024	Kelleigh Bannen, Brothers Osbourne
