= Ruth Hertz Weber =

American composer, pianist

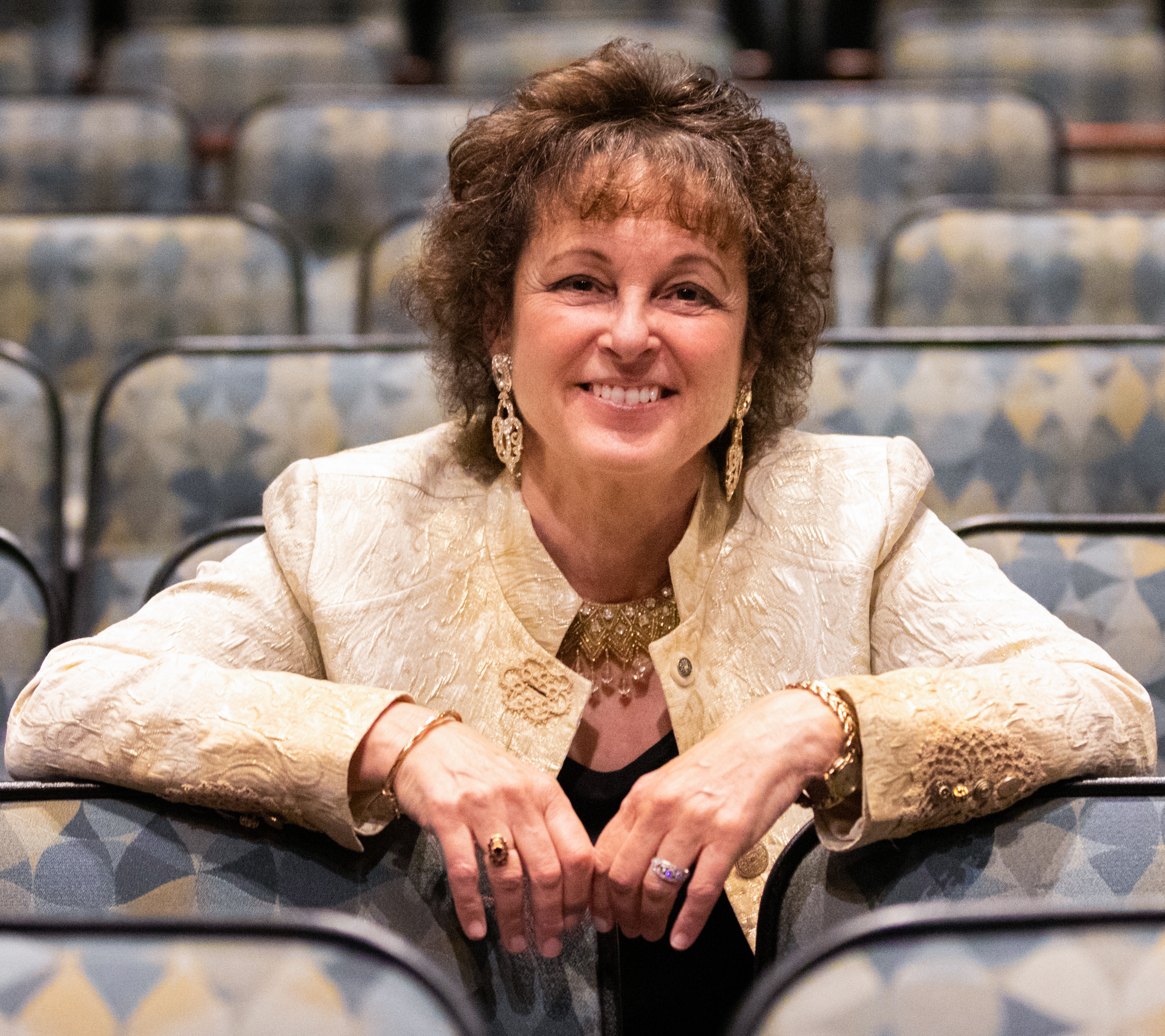
- Weber in 2019

Background information
- Born: San Diego, California, USA
- Genres: World; children's music; new-age; classical; pop
- Occupations: Composer, Conductor, pianist, musician, songwriter, record producer
- Instruments: Piano, voice
- Label: Baa Baa Farms Music
- Website: www.ruthmakesmusic

Ruth Hertz Weber aka Ruth Lopez-Yañez is a composer, conductor, and pianist. She has collaborated on film and music projects with artists such as Dan Aykroyd, Julian Lennon and Ricky Kej and her music has been performed by major symphony orchestras including the Omaha Symphony Orchestra, Nashville Symphony, and Virginia Symphony Orchestra. She has won awards from the John Lennon Songwriting Contest, Parents' Choice Awards and Hollywood Music in Media Awards, among others. As a filmmaker, she directed and produced the 2024 documentary, Ale Brider.

== Early life and education ==
Ruth Karen Hertz was born and raised in San Diego, California, and studied piano, guitar, and voice while growing up. She received her Bachelor of Music degree from San Diego State University (SDSU), and her Master of Music degree from California State University, Northridge (CSUN).

== Career ==
As a composer, Weber's songs have been recorded in the U.S. and abroad, and she has been a winner of the New York Pro/Am Songwriting Competition, The Canadian Songwriting Competition, the Jewish American Songwriting Competition and the Music City Song Festival, among others. Her songs have appeared in film and print music. She is a member of The Recording Academy.

An advocate for education, Weber and her daughter Emilia Lopez-Yañez make up the children's music group Ruth and Emilia. Their debut album "The Spaceship that Fell in My Backyard" received positive reviews and won numerous awards including Hollywood Music in Media Awards.

Weber was named music director for the Center for Jewish Cultural Renaissance after her success with these festivals. Weber was the founder of the Cuyamaca College Chorus and the Accompanying Ensemble at Palomar College. She organized the “A Night at the Opera” fundraiser concerts, which raised over $30,000 the first year, benefiting the student support services at Poway High School, and saving the valuable program for two years in a row.

As one of the music directors at the First United Methodist Church in Escondido, Weber directed the Children's Choir, the Youth Choir, the Church Orchestra, the Disciple Singers, and ran the Children's Choir Festival for several years. As music director for Ner Tamid Synagogue in Rancho Bernardo, Weber formed and directed the Ner Tamid Choir and the Klezmattack Ensemble. She organized and directed two JUMP festivals (Jews United in Music Performance) which aimed to unite the community in song, raise money to buy trees in Israel and sponsor cultural activities in San Diego.

Weber is the former artistic director for the Jean Will Presents concert series at the California Center for the Arts, Escondido, California. As a classical pianist Weber has performed internationally as well as in the U.S. She has worked with the Los Angeles Philharmonic Institute, Opera Aguascalientes, CSUN, The San Fernando Valley Men's Choir, and as a recording artist with the Marantz Pianocorder Division.

- San Diego Jewish Men's Choir

Weber is presently the Artistic Director/Conductor of The San Diego Jewish Men's Choir, which performs over 25 concerts per year in the Southern California area. The choir released its first award-winning album, “Heritage,” on Jan.1, 2014, and its second multi award-winning and Billboard (magazine) charting album, KOCHI, in 2015. Under Weber's leadership the group received a proclamation from Mayor Todd Gloria proclaiming the men's choir's festival/ release party as Chanukah JAM Day 2013. Weber and the Men's Choir have performed on national television as guests on the Chabad Telethon 2014 and on two Jewish Life Television episodes. In 2018, Weber organized a tour for the choir to travel to Omaha, NE, where they performed alongside the Omaha Symphony under the direction of conductor Enrico Lopez-Yañez, and later to Phoenix, AZ. Their album, Legacy, won a Global Music Award for "Best Jewish Music" in 2020.

- Ruth and Emilia

Weber and her daughter, Emilia Lopez-Yañez, formed "Ruth and Emilia", a children's themed musical duo, in 2018. They released two albums, Kokowanda Bay and The Spaceship that Fell in My Backyard, which both received positive reviews. "Repair the World" won the Grand Prize in the John Lennon Songwriting Contest in 2016 and "Everything Is Better With Some Bubbles" won a Hollywood Music in Media Award in 2018, as well as receiving other awards. The duo has performed at museums, libraries, and private events as well as streaming live performances.

== Discography ==
	Title	Artist	Contribution	Year
1st	This Ain't the Number - Single	Marie Lester	Co-Writer	1986
2nd	Oh My Baby	Ruth Lopez-Yañez	Artist/Composer	1990
3rd	Eight Songs of Chanukah	Ruth Lopez-Yañez	Artist/Composer	1992
4th	Me and the Kids	Ruth, Emilia & Enrico Lopez-Yañez	Artist/Composer	1997
5th	Heritage	San Diego Jewish Men's Choir	Conductor/Producer	2015
6th	Forever Strong, a Tribute to the USS Indianapolis	Stephen Melillo	Choral Conductor	2015
7th	Kochi	San Diego Jewish Men's Choir	Conductor/Producer	2016
8th	The Mitzvah Bus	Mister G (children's performer)	Choral Conductor	2016
9th	Hineni, Music for the High Holy Days	Cheri Weiss	Pianist/Vocalist	2016
10th	Shanti Samsara	Ricky Kej	Co-Composer/Choral Director	2016
11th	Action Moves People United	Multiple Artists	Co-Composer/Choral Conductor	2016
12th	Let's Have a Rockin Christmas Vol 2	Various Artists	Co-Composer	2017
13th	Buddha Lounge	Art Tawanghar	Co-Composer	2017
14th	We Are One	Windwalker and MCW	Co-Composer/Arranger	2018
15th	One Little Finger (soundtrack)	Ruth Hertz Weber	Choral and string arrangements, choir director	2019
16th	Kokowanda Bay	Ruth and Emilia	Artist/Composer/Producer	2020
17th	Legacy	San Diego Jewish Men's Choir	Conductor/Producer	2020
18th	I Had A Dream - Songs of an Immigrant	Ruth and Emilia	Artist/Composer/Producer	2021
19th	Arise Together - Children of the World	Ruth and Emilia	Composer/artist/lyrics	2023

== Filmography ==
	Title	Genre	Contribution	Year
1st	One Little Finger	Film	Musical director, choral arrangement	2019
2nd	The Jimmy Star Show with Ron Russell	TV Series	Guest	2022
3rd	Ale Brider	Documentary	Composer, actress, director, producer, choral director, music supervisor	2024

== Awards and nominations ==
Year	Award	Nominated work	Category	Result
1986	New York Pro/Am Song Jubilee	"This Ain't the Number"	Country	Won
1989	Hollywood Song Jubilee	"This Ain't the Number"	Country	Won
1993	American Jewish Song Festival	"Dreidel Sing Along"	World Music	Won
1993	American Jewish Song Festival	"Lion of Judea"	World Music	Won
2014	Global Music Awards	"Heritage" Album	World Music	Won
2015	Global Music Awards	"Kochi" Album	World Music	Won
2015	Parent's Choice Award	"The Mitzvah Bus" Album	Children's	Won
2016	Shalshelet 6th International Festival	"Dreydl Sing Along"	Jewish Music	Won
2016	John Lennon Songwriting Contest	"Where Do I Live"	Children's	Nominated
2016	Hollywood Music in Media Awards	"Enlighten Your Soul"	World Music	Nominated
2016	Hollywood Music in Media Awards	Dreydl Sing Along	Holiday	Nominated
2017	Hollywood Music in Media Award	"Distorted Time"	New Age/Ambient	Nominated
2017	Global Peace Song Awards	"Enlighten Your Soul"	World Music	Won
2018	Family Choice Awards	"The Spaceship that Fell in My Backyard"	Children's	Won
2018	Hollywood Music in Media Awards	"Everything is Better With Bubbles"	Children's Music	Won
2018	Global Music Awards	"The Spaceship that Fell in My Backyard"	Children's	Won
2018	Creative Child Awards	"The Spaceship that Fell in My Backyard"	CDs	Won
2018	LA Music Critics Award	"The Spaceship that Fell in My Backyard"	Children's Pop	Won
2018	Tillywig Toy Awards	"The Spaceship that Fell in My Backyard"	Children's	Won
2018	Hot Diggity Awards	"The Spaceship that Fell in My Backyard"	Children's	Won
2018	National Parenting Product Awards	"The Spaceship that Fell in My Backyard"	Kids and Families	Won
2018	John Lennon Songwriting Contest Grand Prize Winners	"Repair the World" (Tikkun Olam)	Children's	Won
2020	Kids First Endorsement	"Kokowanda Bay Album"	Audio	Won
2020	Global Music Awards	"Kokowanda Bay Album"	Children's Music	Won
2020	Mom's Choice Awards	"Kokowanda Bay Album"	Audio	Won
2020	Parents' Choice Awards	"Kokowanda Bay Album"	Music	Won
2020	Hollywood Music in Media Award	"Like Magic"	Children's Music	Nominated
2022	Accolade Global Film Competition	"Mushrooms"	Original Song	Won
2022	Accolade Global Film Competition	"Mushrooms"	Music Video	Won
2022	Accolade Global Film Competition	"We're goin' Green"	Music Video	Won
2022	Accolade Global Film Competition	"We're goin' Green"	Children/Family Programming	Won
2024	Hollywood Independent Music Awards	"Stronger Together"	Children's Music	Won
2024	Hong Kong Indie Music Festival	Ale Brider (All My Brothers)	Best Composer in Short	Won
2024	Jane Austen International Film Festival	Ale Brider (All My Brothers)	Best Documentary	Won
2024	Paris International Short Festival	Ale Brider	Best Music in Short	Won
2024	Accolade Global Film Competition	Ale Brider (All My Brothers)	Documentary Short	Won
2024	Accolade Global Film Competition	Ale Brider (All My Brothers)	Women Filmmakers	Won
2024	Accolade Global Film Competition	Ale Brider (All My Brothers)	Jewish	Won
2024	Hollywood Independent Filmmaker Awards	Ale Brider (All My Brothers)	Documentary Short	Won
2025	San Diego Short Film Festival	Ale Brider (All My Brothers)	Best Music Score	Won
