= Victor Yampolsky =

Russian conductor

Victor Yampolsky (born 1942) is a Russian-born conductor and the son of pianist Vladimir Yampolsky. He was most recently director of orchestras at Northwestern University's Bienen School of Music, a position he had held from 1984 to 2022. He is the music director emeritus of the Omaha Symphony Orchestra, where he was music director from 1995 to 2004. He also is the music director of the Peninsula Music Festival and the honorary director of the Scotia Festival of Music in Halifax, Nova Scotia, Canada. Before his appointment to the Omaha Symphony Orchestra, Yampolsky served as the principal conductor of the National Symphony Orchestra of South Africa and as the resident conductor of the Chicago Civic Orchestra, the training ground for younger musicians under the auspices of the Chicago Symphony Orchestra.

== Early life ==
Yampolsky was born in the Soviet Union in 1942. He is the son of noted pianist Vladimir Yampolsky. According to his biography, Yampolsky "studied violin with the legendary David Oistrakh at the Moscow Conservatory (1961–1966) and conducting with Maestro Nikolai Rabinovich at the Leningrad Conservatory (1968–1973). He was a member of the Moscow Philharmonic as both violinist and assistant conductor, under the direction of renowned Maestro Kyrill Kondrashin." Yampolsky holds a bachelor's degree in conducting from the Leningrad Conservatory and a second bachelor's degree and artist diploma in violin performance from the Moscow Conservatory.

== Emigration from U.S.S.R. ==
Yampolsky left the Soviet Union in 1973 when a recommendation from Zubin Mehta led to an audition for Leonard Bernstein, who offered Yampolsky a scholarship at Tanglewood Music Center. Two weeks later, Yampolsky accepted a position in the violin section of the Boston Symphony (1973). He was later appointed the orchestra's principal second violinist (1975–1977).

== Conductor ==
Yampolsky left the Boston Symphony Orchestra in 1977 to become the music director of the Atlantic Symphony Orchestra in Halifax, Nova Scotia, Canada. The orchestra was Canada's only professional regional ensemble; Yampolsky was at its helm until financial problems caused its disbanding in 1983. At the same time, he also accepted a position as conductor of the Young Artists Orchestra at the Boston University Tanglewood Institute. In 1979, he was appointed adjunct professor of violin and director of orchestras at the Boston University School of Music. He was principal conductor of the National Symphony Orchestra in Johannesburg from 1993 to 1994. He also was resident conductor of the Chicago Civic Orchestra until 1997.

== Omaha Symphony ==
Yampolsky was appointed music director of the Omaha Symphony Orchestra beginning with the 1995 season after the Omaha orchestra's two-year search process that included seven candidates, including Marin Alsop, Robert Spano and Fabio Mechetti. He replaced Bruce Hangen, who had directed the Omaha Symphony since 1984 and went on to become principal conductor of the Boston Symphony Orchestra's youth concerts and the Boston Pops until 2006.

The symphony orchestra produced its first commercial recording, "Take Flight," under Yampolsky's baton in 2002. The symphony under Yampolsky also performed the world premiere of Philip Glass's Piano Concerto No. 2 (After Lewis and Clark).

In 1997, the Utah Symphony disclosed that Yampolsky was among 12 vying to be its music director. "Utah Symphony president and CEO Donald L. Andrews confirmed that Yampolsky was invited to be a candidate several months ago, but until now, he preferred to have his candidacy kept confidential," according to a 1997 Deseret News article. Yampolsky was not chosen for the Utah post.

The Omaha Symphony's board of directors in 2004 declined to renew Yampolsky's contract, saying board members wanted someone more "charismatic" to lead the orchestra in the future as it moved to its $100 million purpose-built symphony hall, the 2,005-seat Holland Performing Arts Center. Orchestra members were said to be "devastated." "Everybody's in tears," Willis Ann Ross, a former second flutist with the symphony told the Omaha World-Herald. "Number one, Victor doesn't want to leave. And secondly ... it's simply the wrong time, from every level." The symphony hired Thomas Wilkins to lead the orchestra in 2005; Yampolsky retained the title music director emeritus.

== Guest conducting ==
Yampolsky has conducted more than 80 professional and student orchestras throughout the world, including repeat engagements with orchestras in the United States, Canada, Spain, Portugal, Australia, New Zealand, South Africa, South Korea, Taiwan, the Czech Republic and Chile.
