= Enrico Lopez-Yañez =

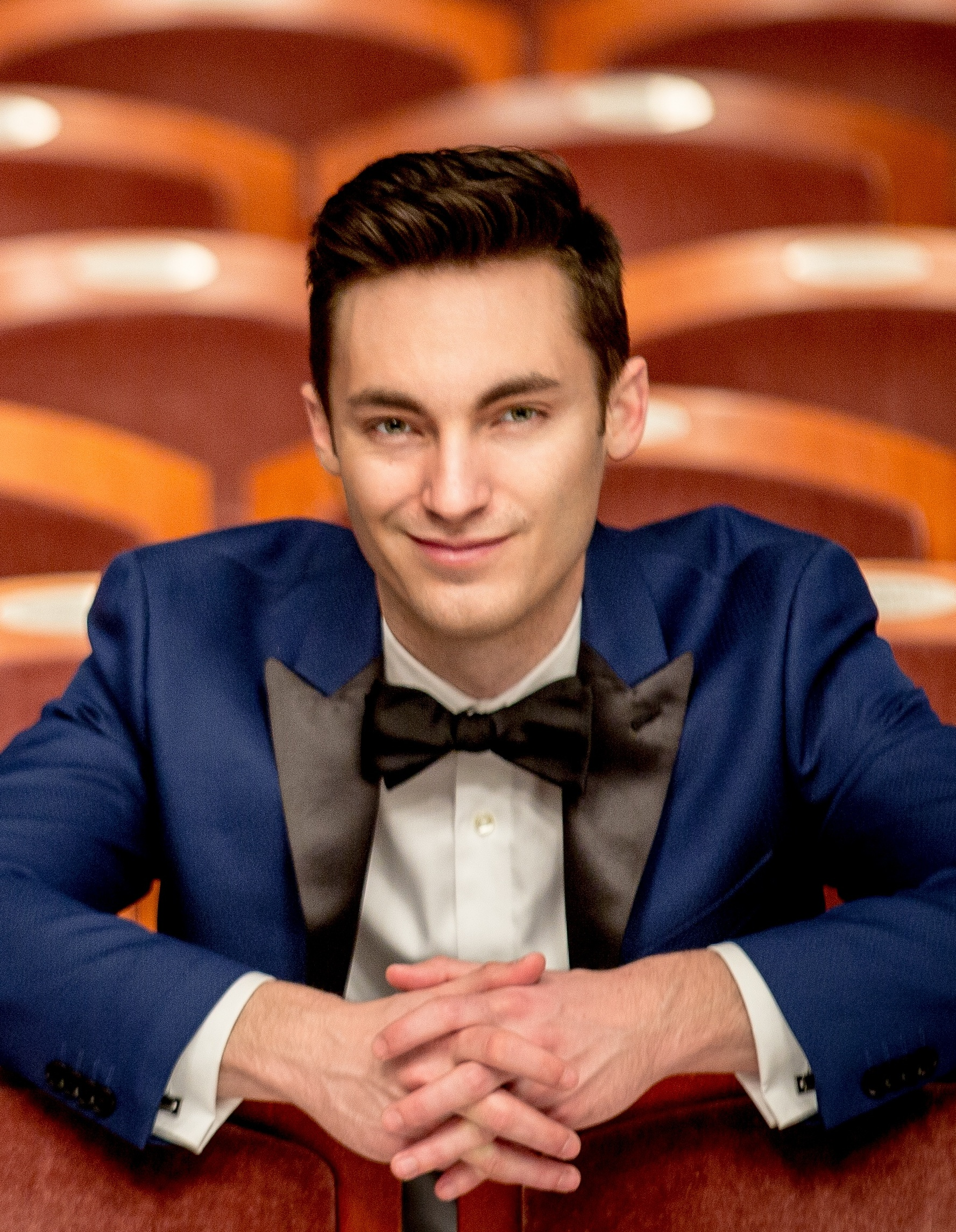

Background information
- Genres: Symphonic
- Occupations: Conductor, Composer, Arranger, Producer
- Years active: 1996–Present
- Website: enricolopezyanez.com

Enrico Lopez-Yañez is the Creative Director & Principal Conductor for Pops and Specials at the Dallas Symphony, Principal Pops Conductor of the Detroit Symphony, Pacific Symphony, and Principal Guest Conductor of Pops at the Indianapolis Symphony. He previously spent eight seasons conducting the Nashville Symphony, where he also served as their Principal Pops Conductor.

== Early life ==
Lopez-Yañez was born in San Diego, California in 1989 to what has called a "very musical household." His father is an opera singer and his mother a pianist. He grew up in Europe and California. He began piano lessons with his mother as his teacher. But, he recalled, "I very quickly got sick of having her correct me from across the house, and I chose other instruments that she could not do so on." He began to play trumpet, later, drums. He played in his high school jazz band and the San Diego Youth Symphony. When traveling to Mexico, he played trumpet in mariachi groups and he even played in a klezmer ensemble that his mother led. With an early interest in orchestral pops, he cofounded the music company Symphonica Productions. He has said, “It seemed like such an innovative space for being creative, designing new programming and collaborating with new artists. I was just really drawn to all the potential that existed in the pops space.”

== Career ==
Enrico Lopez-Yañez began his musical studies at UCLA where he received his Baccalaureate and Masters in Music before going on the get his Masters in Music in Orchestral Conducting from the University of Maryland where he studied under Jim Ross and also received additional studies and masterclasses with Lorin Maazel, and Michael Tilson Thomas.

Lopez-Yañez began his professional career as Assistant Conductor with the Omaha Symphony in 2015 under Music Director Thomas Wilkins. In the summer of 2016, Lopez-Yañez also served as Assistant Conductor to Christoph Eschenbach and Valery Gergiev for the National Youth Orchestra of the United States's Carnegie Hall, New York state, and European tour performances.

While in Omaha, Lopez-Yañez co-founded Symphonica Productions, LLC. Lopez-Yañez designed Symphonic Pops, Family and Education Shows distributed by Symphonica Productions which have been premiered by orchestras such as the Indianapolis Symphony, Rochester Philharmonic, Sarasota Orchestra, Omaha Symphony and the Nashville Symphony. He also reached young audiences through his active role as both a composer/arranger through works such as Kokowanda Bay which was premiered by the Omaha Symphony on their subscription Family Series.

During this period Lopez-Yañez maintained an active role as an operatic conductor serving as Assistant Conductor and Chorus Master for the Berkshire Opera Festival and leading opera gala concerts in San Diego and Aguascalientes (Mexico). He led the Emmy Awards nominated production of Daniel Catán's Rappaccini's Daughter (opera) with Chicago Opera Theater and Giacomo Puccini's Madama Butterfly with Main Street Opera in Chicago, and served as Assistant Conductor for Opera Omaha's production of La Boheme.

After two seasons with the Omaha Symphony, Lopez-Yañez moved to Nashville where he was appointed Assistant Conductor of the Nashville Symphony in 2017. After two seasons as Assistant Conductor, Lopez-Yañez was promoted to Principal Pops Conductor Nashville Symphony, to oversee the Pops and Family Series.

Lopez-Yañez has led performances with artists such as Nas, Dolly Parton, Toby Keith, Kenny G, Jose Carreras, Trisha Yearwood, The Beach Boys, Ben Rector, Cody Fry, Stewart Copeland, Kenny Loggins, Pepe Aguilar, Angela Aguilar, Bernadette Peters, Renée Elise Goldsberry, and the Marcus Roberts Trio.

In 2022 Lopez-Yañez was additionally named Principal Pops Conductor of the Pacific Symphony and Principal Conductor of the Dallas Symphony Presents. In 2023 Lopez-Yañez added the position of Principal Pops Conductor of the Detroit Symphony. In 2024 he also joined the Indianapolis Symphony as their new Principal Guest Conductor of Pops. In 2026 the Dallas Symphony named him Creative Director & Principal Conductor for Pops and Specials .

In 2026, Lopez-Yañez conducted Disney's nationally televised Nashville's Star-Spangled Bash, which drew more than 5.4 million viewers on ABC and ranked No. 1 in primetime television on July 4. He also conducted Los Aguilar Sinfónico Desde El Hollywood Bowl (Live), the 2026 recording documenting Pepe Aguilar, Ángela Aguilar and Leonardo Aguilar's symphonic Hollywood Bowl performances.

Lopez-Yañez has made appearances with orchestras throughout North America, including the Los Angeles Philharmonic, Minnesota Orchestra, National Symphony Orchestra, Philadelphia Orchestra, San Diego Symphony, Baltimore Symphony, Utah Symphony, San Francisco Symphony, Florida Orchestra, and Seattle Symphony, among others.

== Discography ==
| | Title | Artist | Contribution | Year |
|---|---|---|---|---|
| 1st | Let it Shine | Jim Rule | Vocalist | 1996 |
| 2nd | Me and the Kids | Ruth Hertz Weber, Enrico & Emilia Lopez-Yañez | Vocalist | 1997 |
| 3rd | Silly Willy Sports | Brenda Colgate | Vocalist | 1997 |
| 4th | Loco de Amor | Jorge Lopez-Yañez | Trumpet | 2010 |
| 5th | Por ti sere | Banda del Estado de Zacatecas | Trumpet | 2012 |
| 6th | Heritage | San Diego Jewish Men's Choir | Trumpet/Drums | 2015 |
| 7th | Kochi | San Diego Jewish Men's Choir | Drums | 2016 |
| 8th | Action Moves People United | Multiple Artists | Arranger | 2016 |
| 9th | The Spaceship that Fell in My Backyard | Ruth and Emilia | Composer/Producer | 2018 |
| 10th | We Are One | Windwalker and the MCW | Co-Composer/Arranger | 2018 |
| 11th | Kokowanda Bay | Ruth and Emilia | Composer/Producer | 2020 |
| 12th | Miami Guitar Concerto | Sharon Isbin (Guitar), Enrico Lopez-Yañez (Conductor), & Orchestra of St. Luke’s | Conductor | 2025 |
| 13th | Los Aguilar Desde El Hollywood Bowl (Live) | Pepe Aguilar, Angela Aguilar, Leonardo Aguilar, Enrico Lopez-Yañez (Conductor), & Hollywood Bowl Orchestra | Conductor | 2026 |

== Awards and nominations ==
In 2023 Lopez-Yañez was awarded the Mexicanos Distinguidos award, an award given to Mexican citizens living abroad whom are positively promoting the image of Mexico.

As a recording artist/producer/arranger Lopez-Yañez received awards with albums like Ruth and Emilia's The Spaceship that Fell in My Backyard and Kokowanda Bay which won a Parents' Choice Awards, Global Music in Media Award, and the John Lennon Songwriting Contest.
