= San Diego Jewish Men's Choir =

The San Diego Jewish Men's Choir is a community choral ensemble based in San Diego, California, founded in 1998 by Rhoda Gaylis and Dr. Basil Abramowitz. The choir performs a diverse repertoire including liturgical, pop, folk, gospel and musical theater, and sings in Hebrew, English, Yiddish, and Ladino. To date, the choir has released two albums under the direction of their current artistic director, Ruth Weber.

== History ==
In 1994, South African-born Rhoda Gaylis, a concert pianist and opera singer, immigrated to San Diego, California. While in South Africa, Gaylis had founded and directed several choral groups, including the JNF Jewish Ladies Choir, which performed internationally and competed in the Zimrah Choral festival. In 1998, with the encouragement and support of Dr. Basil Abramowitz, Gaylis founded the San Diego Jewish Men's Choir. The original membership of the choir was made up mostly of South African Jews who had immigrated to America and wanted to continue singing the liturgical music they had enjoyed singing in the synagogues in South Africa. Under the direction of Rhoda Gaylis, the choir began performing at weddings, concerts and community functions.

Ruth Hertz Weber (AKA Ruth Lopez-Yanez) became director of the choir in 2010. Weber, a graduate of San Diego State University and California State University, Northridge, came to the choir with extensive experience in liturgical and practical music, working previously as music director for Ner Tamid Synagogue in Rancho Bernardo, a San Diego suburb. She formed and directed the Ner Tamid Choir and the Klezmattack Ensemble, and organized and directed two JUMP festivals (Jews United in Music Performance) . In addition to her credentials as a choral director, Weber is a composer, receiving numerous songwriting awards including 1st place in the New York Pro/Am Songwriting Competition, the Jewish American Songwriting Competition, the Canadian Song Festival, a winner in the Music City Song Festival and one of the composer's whose songs were selected for performance at the Shashelet 6th International Festival of New Jewish Liturgical Music on December 4, 2016. Her songs have been recorded by artists in the U.S. and abroad and have appeared in short films, including the Emmy-nominated "Walking on Water". Under Weber's direction, the choir greatly broadened its repertoire and expanded their performance schedule to over 20 concerts a year, and released their first commercial recording, "Heritage". They have been featured on the Chabad Telethon, have performed annually in the Lipinsky Family San Diego Jewish Music Festival, in the JUMP Festival, with the San Diego Interfaith Orchestra and Chorus series in A Night at the Opera gala concert, and hosted the city-wide Chanukah JAM.

On May 10, 2013, the choir launched a Kickstarter campaign to raise funds to facilitate the release of their first album, "Heritage". The planned recording and the crowd funding campaign were a major step forward for the choir, both commercially and in terms of their mission: "The San Diego Jewish Men’s Choir’s CD will serve as a vehicle for disseminating this wonderful music to a larger audience. We hope to be able to reach both the senior community, who fondly remember this music of their youth, and younger generations who can, in turn, pass on the richness of the Judaic music culture to future generations." The campaign was a success, with total pledges exceeding the choir's goal. The finished album consisted of eleven tracks, and presented a wide range of Jewish music, from classical/liturgical (Louis Lewandowski), and Yiddish musicals, (Bei Mir Bist Du Shein), to Ladino favorites (Adio Querida), contemporary Jewish songs (Lo Teida Milchama) and wedding songs (Mi Adir). As a lead up to the album's official release, the choir performed a selection on the Chabad Telethon on August 25, 2013 and was a featured performers at the Chanukah JAM on November 24 of that year. The album was released on Amazon.com, iTunes and CDBaby on January 1, 2014. A portion of the proceeds from album sales went to provide free CD's to libraries, senior homes, and Jewish schools in order to preserve and promote Jewish choral music. In July, 2014, "Heritage" was awarded a Silver Medal from the Global Music Awards in the category of Jewish Historical Choral Music.

The inspiration for the choir's second album, "Kochi", came about when a choir member told director Ruth Weber about a tour he had taken to India, hosted by the eminent scholar Rabbi Marvin Tokayer, a recognized expert on the history of Asian Jewry. The tour visited the ancient Indian city of Kochi (Cochin), an historic Jewish enclave on the southwest coast of India. Weber approached the Grammy-winning composer and producer Ricky Kej with her ideas for an album of Indian-Jewish choral music. Kej assembled a team of Indian musicians to provide instrumental tracks, including Vanil Veigas, (keyboards, santoor, sarangi), Varsha Kej, (sitar), Butto, (bansuri flute), Karthik K., (percussion). Danny Flam contributed the brass arrangements, and Ruth Weber most of the vocal arrangements. The finished album consisted of ten tracks, that included Ladino, Israeli and traditional Hebrew melodies paired with Kej's Indian-inflected orchestrations. The album was released on August 7, 2015 debuting at the No. 3 on the August 29, 2015 Billboard World Music Chart. The album would go on to win 2 Silver Medals in the July 2015 Global Music Awards, as well as placing at the #7 position on the August 29, 2015 Billboard Heatseeker Pacific Charts. A portion of the proceeds from sales of the album go to the Gabriel Project Mumbai, a non-profit service organization which provides nutrition, literacy, and basic hygiene needs to thousands of children in the slums of Mumbai, India.

The choir appeared on the documentary, "Forever Strong", a Tribute to the USS Indianapolis" (music composed by Stephen Melillo), and were featured performers on the Grammy-winning children's music artist Mister G’s (AKA Ben Gundersheimer) Parents' Choice Gold Award-winning album, "The Mitzvah Bus". On October 24, 2015, the choir performed as part of the [Havdalah] Unity Concert, concluding the 2015 Shabbat San Diego observances, to an audience of over 5,000 people, as part of the Shabbos Project, a global celebration of the Jewish Sabbath held in over 900 cities in 75 countries around the world. In January 2018, the choir traveled to Omaha, NE to perform alongside the Omaha Symphony under the direction of conductor Enrico Lopez-Yañez.

== Discography ==
- "Heritage" (2014)
- "Forever Strong (A Tribute to the U.S.S. Indianapolis)" (2015)
- "The Mitzvah Bus" (2015)
- "Kochi" (2015)
