= Music in the Air (TV program) =

- Genre: Classical music
- Country of origin: Canada
- Original language: English
- No. of seasons: 1
- No. of episodes: 9

Production
- Running time: 60 minutes

Original release
- Network: CBC Television
- Release: 4 July – 5 September 1982

Music in the Air is a Canadian music television program that aired on CBC Television in 1982.

== Premise ==
This series of symphony orchestra recitals was recorded with live audiences in various Canadian cities, in studios and auditoriums.

== Scheduling ==
This hour-long program was broadcast Sundays at 10:00 p.m. (Eastern) from 4 July to 5 September 1982.

== Episodes ==
- Atlantic Symphony Orchestra - featuring Gary Karr (double bass) and Philippe Djokic (violin); produced through CBC Halifax
- Atlantic Symphony Orchestra - featuring Édith Butler (vocalist) and John Neville (actor); produced through CBC Halifax
- Victoria Symphony - featuring Katja Cervosek; produced in Vancouver
- Kitchener-Waterloo Symphony - two episodes, one of which featured Anton Kuerti
- Hamilton Philharmonic Orchestra - two episodes which featured the Elmer Iseler Singers
- Edmonton Symphony Orchestra - two episodes, observing its 30th anniversary, one episode of which featured James Campbell (clarinet)
