= Kenneth Schermerhorn =

- Born: Kenneth Dewitt Schermerhorn; November 20, 1929; Schenectady, New York, United States
- Died: April 18, 2005 (aged 75) Nashville, Tennessee, United States
- Occupations: Composer, conductor
- Formerly of: Nashville Symphony

Kenneth Dewitt Schermerhorn (/ˈskɜːrmərhɔːrn/ SKUR-mər-horn; November 20, 1929 – April 18, 2005) was an American composer and orchestra conductor. He was the music director of the Nashville Symphony from 1983 to 2005.

== Early life ==
Schermerhorn was born on November 20, 1929, in Schenectady, New York. He studied clarinet, violin, and trumpet in school. He attended the New England Conservatory of Music, graduating in 1950.

== Career ==
Schermerhorn played the trumpet with the Boston Symphony Orchestra and the Kansas City Philharmonic among several other orchestras. He was drafted into the U.S. Army and, in 1953 while serving in Germany, he was assigned to be the conductor of the U.S. Seventh Army's Seventh Army Symphony Orchestra. This was his first conducting position and he proved to be quite successful, winning the Elizabeth Sprague Coolidge Medal and the Harriet Cohen International Music Award for young conductors.

After leaving the army, Schermerhorn studied and played under Leonard Bernstein at Tanglewood Music Center in Massachusetts, where he won the Serge Koussevitzky Memorial Conducting Award for two consecutive years. Later in life, Schermerhorn worked again under Bernstein as the assistant conductor of the New York Philharmonic.

In 1957, Schermerhorn was appointed to the position of music director of the American Ballet Theatre, a position he held until 1968 and again from 1982 to 1984. Schermerhorn conducted the 1977 television production of The Nutcracker, starring Mikhail Baryshnikov, Gelsey Kirkland and the American Ballet Theatre. He also conducted other ballets in which Baryshnikov appeared during the 1970s, such as Twyla Tharp's Push Comes To Shove.

Schermerhorn was the music director of the New Jersey Symphony Orchestra from 1963 to 1965. In 1968, he became the music director and conductor of the Milwaukee Symphony Orchestra. During his time there, he was awarded the Sibelius Medal in 1979 from the Finnish government for his outstanding performance of works by Jean Sibelius.

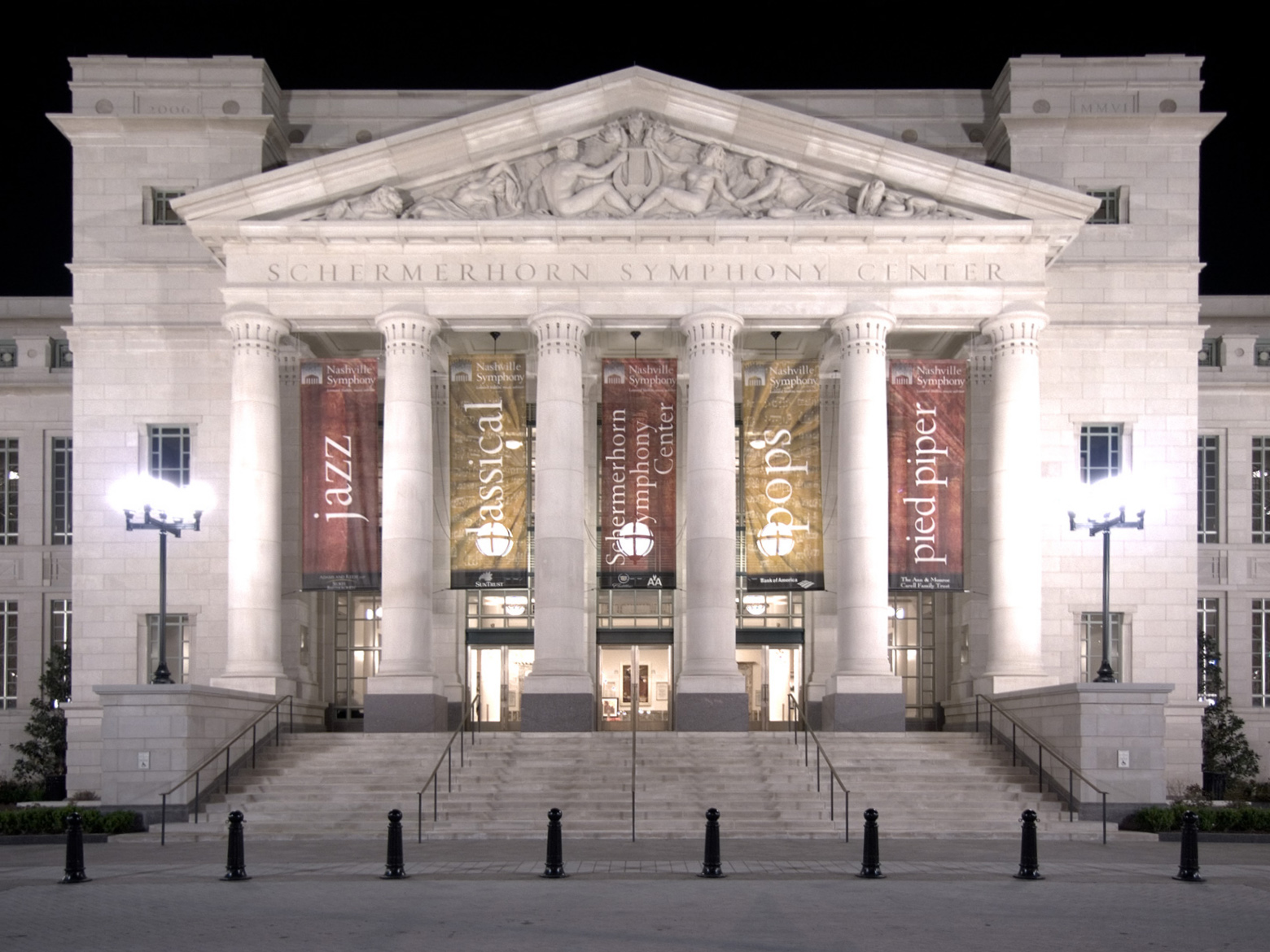
The Schermerhorn Symphony Center in Nashville, Tennessee.

Schermerhorn joined the Nashville Symphony Orchestra as music director and conductor in 1983. The Schermerhorn Symphony Center in Nashville, Tennessee, is named in his honor. The name of the Symphony Center was announced before his death.

Schermerhorn was also the music director of the Hong Kong Philharmonic Orchestra between 1984 and 1988. He helped improve the orchestra's quality and made several recordings with the orchestra, most notably, conducting the orchestra on its first 1986 tour of the People's Republic of China, with the soloists Stephanie Chase and Li Jian, and attracting worldwide media attention.

Schermerhorn was a national patron of Delta Omicron, an international professional music fraternity.

== Personal life and death ==
Schermerhorn had a son, Stefan Schermerhorn, and two daughters, Veronica Chasanoff and Erica Ancona. He had a long-term relationship with Martha Rivers Ingram, a billionaire businesswoman and philanthropist.

Earlier, he was married to the former ballerina Lupe Serrano and, subsequently, to the soprano, Carol Neblett.

Schermerhorn died on April 18, 2005, at Vanderbilt University Medical Center after a brief illness with non-Hodgkin lymphoma. His ashes are buried in the base of the statue "The Flutist" in the garden of the Schermerhorn Symphony Center in Nashville.
