= John Mauceri =

American conductor, producer, educator and writer

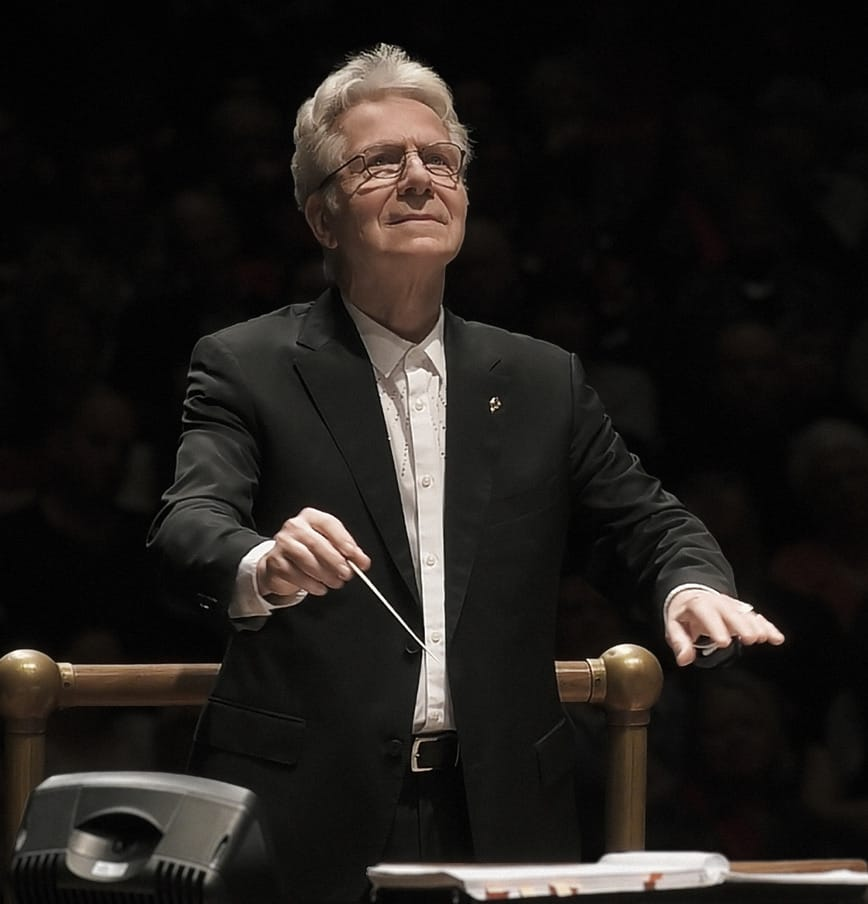
- John Mauceri, Glasgow, 2020
- Born: John Francis Mauceri; September 12, 1945 (age 80); New York City, U.S.
- Education: East Meadow High School
- Alma mater: Yale University
- Occupations: conductor, actor, producer, arranger, voice actor, educator, writer and music composer
- Years active: 1966–present
- Spouse: Betty
- Website: johnmauceri.com

John Francis Mauceri /maʊˈtʃɛri/ (born September 12, 1945) is an American conductor, composer, author, and educator whose work has focused on orchestral music, opera, Broadway, and film-related repertoire. A graduate of Yale University, where he later taught music for more than a decade, he has conducted the major orchestras and opera companies in the world, including the Metropolitan Opera, La Scala, the Royal Opera House (Covent Garden), the Deutsche Oper Berlin, New York Philharmonic, Los Angeles Philharmonic, London Symphony Orchestra, Chicago Symphony Orchestra, Orchestre National de France, Cleveland Orchestra, London Philharmonic Orchestra, the National Symphony (Washington), Philadelphia Orchestra, Radio-Symphonieorchester Wien (Vienna), San Francisco Symphony, Tokyo Philharmonic, and the Leipzig Gewandhaus Orchestra. He has won a Tony, Grammy, and three Emmy awards, as well as an Olivier Award. Further, he conducted the Oscar–winning music for the soundtrack of the film version of Evita. As a founder and educator, he created and directed the Hollywood Bowl Orchestra and was founding chancellor of the University of North Carolina School of the Arts. He is the author of several books on conducting and the history of 20th-century music.

== Early career and education ==
Born in New York City, Mauceri attended East Meadow High School on Long Island and studied music theory and composition at Yale University earning a BA in 1967 and a Master of Philosophy in music theory in 1972. His teachers included William G. Waite, Claude V. Palisca, Beekman Cannon, Leon Plantinga, and Robert Bailey in musicology; Mel Powell, Donald Martino, Allen Forte and Peter Sculthorpe in theory and composition; Donald Currier in piano; and Gustav Meier in conducting. In addition he studied 20th-century architecture with Vincent Scully, French literature with Henri Peyre, religion (Pelikan and Kuttner) and psychology (Logan and Childe).

In his senior year he made his conducting debut (December 4, 1966, Branford College), composed the music for a production of Brecht's A Man Is a Man, guest conducted the Yale Symphony Orchestra (YSO), and produced and music directed Benjamin Britten's Curlew River at Yale's St. Thomas More Chapel (March 11 and 12, 1967) and then brought the production to New York City for its New York premiere, which took place at the Catholic Chapel of the United Nations (Holy Family church) on May 13 and 14, 1967. He graduated cum laude, won the Wrexham Prize "for highest musical achievement", the Francis Vernan Prize for composition, and the Branford Arts Prize for his "devotion to the advancement of the arts".

Accepted with a full scholarship into Yale's Graduate School in music theory, he was soon appointed to the faculty as music director of the Yale Symphony Orchestra (1968–1974) and continued on for a total of fifteen years as both a guest conductor and music director of the opera program at the Yale School of Music. Mauceri is credited for building the Yale Symphony Orchestra into one of the most respected student orchestras in the world. During his tenure with the YSO he brought the orchestra to Paris (Théâtre des Champs-Élysées) for Paris premieres of Ives's Symphony No. 4, Debussy's Khamma and Scriabin's Prométhée. He produced and conducted the YSO for the European premiere of Leonard Bernstein's Mass in Vienna (broadcast worldwide on PBS, BBC and the ORF), the world premiere of Charles Ives's Three Places in New England in its original, large orchestra version, as well as the world premiere of the critical edition of Ives's Orchestral Set No. 2. His programs drew capacity audiences for seven years and included the American premiere of Debussy's 1913 ballet Khamma, the American premiere of Strauss's silent film (1926) of Der Rosenkavalier, the world premiere of a completely staged pageant-version of Karlheinz Stockhausen's Hymnen involving 1000 performers on Yale's Cross Campus, the American premiere of Hindemith's orchestrated songs Das Marienleben and rare performances of Scriabin's Prometheus: The Poem of Fire (with coordinated lasers), John Cage's Atlas Eclipticalis, Wagner's Das Rheingold, Schoenberg's Gurre-Lieder, Messiaen's Réveil des oiseaux and Stravinsky's Agon.

In 1973, Mauceri made both his professional orchestral debut with the Los Angeles Philharmonic and his operatic debut conducting Menotti's The Saint of Bleecker Street at the Wolf Trap Festival.

== Music championed ==
Committed to preserving two American art forms, the Broadway musical, and Hollywood film scores, he has edited and performed many restorations and first performances, including a full restoration of the original 1943 production of Rodgers & Hammerstein's Oklahoma!, performing editions of Gershwin's Porgy and Bess, Girl Crazy and Strike up the Band, Bernstein's Candide and A Quiet Place, and film scores by Miklós Rózsa, Franz Waxman, Erich Wolfgang Korngold, Max Steiner, Elmer Bernstein, Jerry Goldsmith, Danny Elfman and Howard Shore. As one of two conductors in Decca Records' award-winning series Entartete Musik, Mauceri made a number of historic first recordings of music banned by the Nazis as degenerate music. The intersection of the "degenerate composers" of Europe and the refugee composers of Hollywood is the subject of much of his research and his writings. In addition, Mauceri has conducted significant premieres of works by Verdi, Debussy, Hindemith, Ives, Stockhausen, and Weill.

== Work in musical theatre ==
Mauceri made his Broadway debut on March 10, 1974, as music director of Hal Prince's production of Leonard Bernstein's Candide which had begun as a limited run at the Brooklyn Academy of Music. This version of the show was given a Special Tony Award for "The Advancement of the American Musical Theatre". He subsequently served as music director for the "Opera House" version of Candide (providing additional orchestrations and supervising the placement of the music within the text of Hugh Wheeler's book) that premiered at the New York City Opera in 1982. Its 1986 recording won Mauceri a Grammy for "Best Opera Recording". In 1988, as Music Director of Scottish Opera, Mauceri initiated a third version based on a reading of Voltaire adapted by John Wells and directed by Jonathan Miller. Mauceri was able to make use of virtually all the music Bernstein had composed for various versions of Candide between 1956 and 1971. This final version had its world premiere at the Theatre Royal, Glasgow, with Bernstein in attendance, and broadcast on BBC television. It was transferred to the Sadler's Wells Theatre in London where it won the 1988 Olivier Award as "Musical of the Year." Bernstein subsequently recorded this version in London, and it won him a posthumous Grammy for "Best Classical Album" of 1990.

Mauceri took a leadership role in reevaluating the American musical theater in his historically informed performances and recordings of classic American musicals, such as the Gershwins' 1930 score to Girl Crazy (Elektra Nonesuch 9 79250-2) in 1990 (winner of the Edison Klassiek Award), both the 1927 and 1930 versions of the Gershwins' Strike Up the Band (1991 – Elektra Nonesuch 79273-2 and PS Classics PS-1100 respectively) and most importantly On Your Toes (1936) by Rodgers and Hart which he initiated and co-produced in 1983. Mauceri, representing the Kennedy Center for the Performing Arts, hired George Abbott (then 96 years old), George Balanchine (his last assignment) and found the original orchestrator, Hans Spialek, to restore the score. On Your Toes ran 505 performances on Broadway and marked the first time a musical from the 1930s was seen and heard on Broadway with its original musical elements intact in over a generation. Its cast album, conducted by Mauceri, is the first fully digital Broadway cast album (TER Limited: CDTER 1063). The show was nominated for five Antoinette Perry ("Tony") Awards and won two: for Best Revival of a Musical and Best Actress in a Musical (Natalia Makarova). In addition, On Your Toes won four Drama Desk Awards (Outstanding Revival; Outstanding Actress in a Musical; Outstanding Director of a Musical; Outstanding Orchestrations). As a result of its success, the received wisdom of rewriting old musicals and adding new orchestrations and hit songs from other shows was challenged and has led to a proliferation of organizations that present classic American musicals with their original scores restored as written, though these performances are generally in a semi-staged format.

Andrew Lloyd Webber attended a performance of La bohème at the Royal Opera House, Covent Garden, in the winter of 1984 that was conducted by Mauceri and as a result invited him to be the musical supervisor of the Broadway production of his Song and Dance, which opened on September 18, 1985, and received eight Tony Award nominations, and one win for Bernadette Peters. In October 1995, after the first recording session for the soundtrack to Evita failed, "Andrew ... suggested we bring in the celebrated American conductor John Mauceri. ... By the end of the week, the maestro Mauceri had performed his magic with a brilliant catchment of the finest orchestral players in London and all thoughts of Black Monday were forgotten." As gratitude for his work on the film, Mauceri was given something unheard of in film—a full screen credit, even though he had no contract for any billing whatsoever.

Mauceri led the charge in reassessing the American works of Kurt Weill, which had been generally viewed as inferior to his German works. In 1978, he conducted Weill's 1947 opera Street Scene at the New York City Opera, which was so successful, it was broadcast in the subsequent season on PBS' Live from Lincoln Center. Beginning with Weill's Lady in the Dark at the Edinburgh Festival in 1988, and followed by the first professional production of Street Scene in the UK, Mauceri argued that the American works were equal to and continued directly out of the German works. His recording of Street Scene (Decca 433 371–2) released in 1991, is the first complete recording of any American theater work of Kurt Weill. Mauceri brought Street Scene for its country premieres in Portugal (Lisbon Opera), and Italy (Teatro Regio, Turin). In addition, he brought Weill's music back to Berlin, where it had been mostly forgotten. Two recordings with Ute Lemper (Ute Lemper Sings Kurt Weill Volumes 1 and 2) represented Weill's music with texts in German, French and English, demonstrating the composer's continuity of style and ideas. In addition, his Berlin recordings include Weill's The Seven Deadly Sins (Die sieben Todsünden) with Lemper, the Little Mahagonny (Mahagonny-Songspiel) and the first German language recording of The Threepenny Opera (Die Dreigroschenoper) made in over forty years (Decca 430 075-2 LH) released in 1989. In 2000, he led a series of performances of Kurt Weill's 1933 bible play, The Eternal Road (Der Weg der Verheissung) in which he and musicologist Ed Harsh restored the complete score which had never been heard with its complete fourth act and never in Europe. These performances were co-productions of the New Israeli Opera, the Chemnitz Opera in Germany and the Brooklyn Academy of Music. The work was performed in its original German text by fellow refugee Franz Werfel and televised in Europe from its Chemnitz performances. In 2001, Mauceri led the world premiere recording of Weill's early operatic success, Der Protagonist from 1926 (Capriccio 60 086) which was also broadcast on German radio in a concert performance in the Berliner Philharmonie.

== Work in opera ==
After making his operatic debut at the Wolf Trap Festival in 1973, Mauceri continued to build his operatic repertoire conducting at the Metropolitan Opera, La Scala, the Royal Opera House, the Deutsche Oper Berlin, and numerous others around the world. At San Francisco Opera he conducted the premiere of Andrew Imbrie's Angle of Repose in 1976. At Washington Opera and La Scala, Mauceri had the privilege of conducting the American and European premieres of Leonard Bernstein's A Quiet Place in 1984. In 1972 Mauceri was invited to be Bernstein's assistant for a new production of Carmen at the Met. This began an association between the two that would span the next eighteen years. During this time Mauceri edited, supervised and conducted numerous Bernstein works throughout the world, including many premieres, at the composers request. In addition to his guest appearances at the world's great opera houses, Mauceri also served as music director of the Washington Opera at the Kennedy Center as well as Pittsburgh Opera, and was direttore stabile of the Teatro Regio in Turin, Italy, for three years. His time in Italy was preceded by the seven years where he served as music director of Scottish Opera where he helmed 22 productions and three recordings. Mauceri is the first American ever to have held the post of music director of an opera house in either Great Britain or Italy. Through his sedulously researched renditions of the nineteenth century's pre-eminent operas, Mauceri solidified his reputation "as a musicologist and theorist" as he was "the first to demonstrate, in print and in performance, that the use of metronomic tempos were a structural element in the operas of Giuseppe Verdi". He has spoken about and written numerous articles expounding his fidelity to the composer's intent and the necessity of fully understanding it in performance.

== Time at the Hollywood Bowl ==
After forty years of dormancy the Hollywood Bowl Orchestra was re-created for Mauceri by the Los Angeles Philharmonic Association in 1991. "During his sixteen-season tenure, Mauceri and the Hollywood Bowl Orchestra toured Japan four times and, in November 1996, performed two public concerts in Rio de Janeiro and São Paulo, Brazil, representing the first time an American orchestra was invited to Brazil specifically to perform the great music of the American cinema." Breaking all records at the Bowl, he conducted over 300 concerts at the 18,000-seat amphitheater with a total audience of four million people. In addition to being inducted into the Hollywood Bowl Hall of Fame alongside Plácido Domingo in 2007, Mauceri received a Treasure of Los Angeles Award, a Young Musicians Foundation Award, and even his own day, "John Mauceri Day", by the state of California.

== Work in academia ==
Mauceri was appointed chancellor of the University of North Carolina School of the Arts by President Erskine Bowles on May 2, 2006. During his seven-year tenure he lobbied and secured to have "University" added to the school's name to distinguish it from the growing number of arts magnet high schools and to affirm the school's relationship with the UNC system. He implemented a two-semester calendar and conceived and implemented the school's first full summer school. Under his leadership the school's retention within the system ranked second only to UNC Chapel Hill. Mauceri increased UNCSA's endowment by 60% and successfully lobbied the NC General Assembly to grant recurring millions of dollars of appropriations to the school and secured significant private funds during the economic downturn that threatened the very existence of the school. At the time of his retirement from the post the school had $55 million worth of capital projects in the works, including a new library, and a film school animation building. For the first time in the school's history, the faculty agreed to having a ranking system, Kiplinger's ranked the school for the first time in its history as one of the "100 top Values in Public Education", and Mauceri raised the monies to support a television series of student performances which he also produced. These included The Nutcracker, a complete restoration of the original 1943 production of Rodgers & Hammerstein's Oklahoma! (winner of a National Educational Television Award), and the American premiere of Erich Wolfgang Korngold's score in a fully staged production of Shakespeare's Much Ado About Nothing (regional Emmy for Best Arts Program, 2013). As chancellor, Mauceri brought his students to perform, assist, and observe productions at the Hollywood Bowl, the Vienna Konzerthaus, the Danish National Orchestra (Copenhagen), the National Symphony at the Kennedy Center, the opera of Bilbao, Spain, the Aspen Music Festival, the 50th Anniversary Grammy Award Ceremony, the Ravinia Festival, the Washington National Opera, as well as the opening of the North Carolina Museum of Art and the 2013 Rite at 100 Festival at Chapel Hill's Memorial Hall.

Prior to his time at UNCSA, Mauceri served on the faculty of his alma mater, Yale University for 15 years where he "taught orchestration, conducting, gave guest lectures in the German and Italian Departments and, with the Yale Symphony, developed the concept of thematic programming built on his studies of information theory, linguistics, and psychoacoustics". Mauceri left the faculty of Yale in 1982 as Associate Professor, and in 1985 was awarded Yale's first Arts Alumni Award for Outstanding Achievement. He returned to his alma mater in 2001 to teach a course in 20th century aesthetic history and the effects of World War II on current perceptions of classical music. In addition, he conducted both the Yale Symphony and Yale Philharmonia in a concert celebrating the 300th anniversary of the founding of Yale College on April 19, 2001.

== Media and awards ==
Mauceri is one of the world's most accomplished recording artists, having released over 75 audio CDs and is the recipient of a Grammy, a Tony, an Olivier, a Drama Desk, an Edison Klassiek, 3 Emmy Awards, 2 Diapasons d'Or, a Cannes Classique, an ECHO Klassik, a Billboard, and four Deutsche Schallplatten awards. In 1999, Mauceri was chosen as a "Standard-bearer of the Twentieth Century" for WQXR. According to WQXR, "These are a select number of musical artists who have already established themselves as forces to be reckoned with and who will be the Standard Bearers of the 21st Century's music scene." The recipients were chosen for "their visionary talent and technical virtuosity". In addition, CNN and CNN International chose Mauceri as a "Voice of the Millennium".

In other media, Mauceri had a small role as the character Claude Maginot in 2002's Grand Theft Auto: Vice City. He appeared briefly as himself in the second episode of the Studio 60 on the Sunset Strip TV series, conducting the fictional "West Coast Philharmonic". Mauceri served as consultant on Todd Field's script for the 2022 film Tár, helping to inform the tenor and accuracy of Lydia Tár's comments on classical music and musicians.

== Personal life ==
Mauceri lives in New York City with his wife, Betty.

== Publications ==
- Mauceri, John (2017). Maestros and Their Music – The Art and Alchemy of Conducting. Knopf Doubleday. ISBN 9780451494030.
- — (2019). Leonard Bernstein – A Centenary Celebration. Knopf Doubleday. ISBN 9781984897527.
- — (2019). For the Love of Music – A Conductor's Guide to the Art of Listening. Knopf Doubleday. ISBN 9780525520665.
- with Baldwin, Alec (2019). For the Love of Classical Music – In Conversation with Alec Baldwin. Knopf Doubleday. ISBN 9781984899590.
- He published his thoughts on the effects of the displacement of many European composers to America on classical music in his 2022 book The War on Music – Reclaiming the Twentieth Century.

== Discography ==
- 1973 Bizet: Carmen (Chorus director and assistant to Leonard Bernstein) Deutsche Grammophon 2709 043 (Grammy Best Opera Recording)
- 1973 Bernstein: Candide (Original 1973 cast recording) Columbia S2X32923
- 1983 Rodgers and Hart: On Your Toes (1st digital cast album, 1st complete recording) TER CDTER 1063
- 1985 Webber: Song and Dance (Songs) RCA RCD1-7162
- 1986 Bernstein: Candide (1982 New York City Opera), New World Records NW340/341-2 (Grammy Best Opera Recording)
- 1986 Richard Rodgers: Three Ballets (First complete recordings of Slaughter on Tenth Avenue / Ghost Town / La Princesse Zenobia) Polygram 422-829675-2
- 1987 Lerner & Loewe: My Fair Lady, Decca 421 200–2
- 1988 Rimsky-Korsakov: Scheherazade MCA Classics MCAD-25187
- 1988 Weill: Ute Lemper Sings Kurt Weill, Decca 425 204–2
- 1989 Weill: The Threepenny Opera, Decca 430 075-2
- 1990 Josephine Barstow: Final Scenes (world premiere recording of first Alfano ending to Puccini's Turandot) Decca 430 203–2
- 1990 Weill: The Seven Deadly Sins; Mahagonny Songspiel, London Decca 430168-2 (Deutsche Schallplaten Award)
- 1990 Gershwin: Girl Crazy, Nonesuch 9 79250-9 (1991 Edison Klassiek Award)
- 1991 Hollywood Dreams, Philips Classics 432 109–2
- 1991 The Gershwins in Hollywood (World premiere recording of New York Rhapsody, Shall We Dance Final Ballet, etc.) Philips 434 274–2 (Deutsche Schallplaten Award)
- 1991 Gershwin: Strike Up the Band (1927 version), Elektra Nonesuch 79273-2
- 1991 Weill: Street Scene (1990 studio cast world premiere recording), London Decca 4333 371–2 (Deutsche Schallplaten Award)
- 1992 Blitzstein: Regina (World Premiere Recording of Original 3 Act version) Ed. Mauceri/Krasker London Decca 433812-2
- 1992 The King and I (1992 studio cast recording of film orchestrations with Julie Andrews and Ben Kingsley) Philips 438 007-2 [93 Billboard Award: Classical Crossover Album of the Year]
- 1992 Rodgers & Hammerstein Overtures "Opening Night" (1st Complete Recording) Philips 434 127–2
- 1993 Korngold: Das Wunder der Heliane, London Decca 436 636–2 (ECHO Award, Deutsche Schallplaten Award)
- 1993 The Great Waltz, Philips 438685-2
- 1993 Weill: Ute Lemper Sings Kurt Weill Vol. 2, Decca 436417-2
- 1993 American Classics (includes Duke Ellington's Harlem new edition by Mauceri) Philips 438 663–2
- 1994 That's Entertainment III (Soundtrack) Angel/MGM Records CDQ 5 55215 2 1
- 1994 Hollywood Nightmares, Philips 442 425–2
- 1994 Songs of The Earth (25 Hours on Our Planet), Philips 438 867–2
- 1994 Berlin: Patti LuPone Sings Irving Berlin, Philips 446 406–2
- 1995 Schulhoff: Flammen (world premiere recording) Decca 444 6302 (Diapson d'Or Award)
- 1995 Korngold: Erich Wolfgang Korngold: Between Two Worlds, London 444 170–2
- 1995 Music for the Movies: The Sound of Hollywood, Sony Classical
- 1995 Journey to the Stars, Philips 446 403–2
- 1996 Webber: Evita (soundtrack) Warner Bros. Records 9362-46346-2
- 1996 Violin Concertos: Korngold, Weill, Krenek (world premiere recording) Decca 452 481–2
- 1996 Hollywood Bowl on Broadway, Philips 446 404–2
- 1996 Prelude to a Kiss: The Duke Ellington Album, 446 717–2
- 1996 Always and Forever, Philips 446 681–2
- 1997 Schoenberg in Hollywood, Decca 448 619–2
- 2001 Weill: Der Protagonist (world premiere recording) Capriccio 60 086 (Cannes Classique Award)
- 2001 Star Wars: The Sound of Hollywood, Philips / Eloquence / Philips
- 2001 Hollywood Bowl Orchestra / John Mauceri: Greatest Hits, Universal Classics 289 468 686–2
- 2006 Gershwin: Porgy and Bess (world premiere of original 1935 production version, ed. Mauceri) Decca B0007431-02 (Diapason d'Or)
- 2006 Elfman: Serenada Schizophrana (world premiere recording) Sony Classical 2876-89780-2
- 2011 Gershwin: Strike Up the Band (1930 version) (1990 studio cast recording), PS Classics PS-1100
- 2013 Korngold: Much Ado About Nothing, Op. 11 (1st complete recording), Toccata Classics TOCC 0160
- 2014 Music for Alfred Hitchcock, Toccata Classics TOCC 0241

Preceded by Alexander Gibson	Music director, Scottish Opera; 1987–1993	Succeeded by Richard Armstrong
Preceded by none	Principal conductor, Hollywood Bowl Orchestra; 1991–2006	Succeeded by Thomas Wilkins
Preceded by (not known)	Music director, Pittsburgh Opera; 2000–2006	Succeeded by Antony Walker
