= Yampil =

Yampil (Ukrainian: Ямпіль) is a common toponym (place name) in Ukraine:

== Raions ==
- Yampil Raion, Sumy Oblast
- Yampil Raion, Vinnytsia Oblast

== Cities ==
- Yampil, Vinnytsia Oblast, center of the former Yampil Raion located in Vinnytsia Oblast

== Rural settlements ==
- Yampil, Donetsk Oblast, a rural settlement in Donetsk Oblast
- Yampil, Khmelnytskyi Oblast, a rural settlement in Khmelnytskyi Oblast
- Yampil, Sumy Oblast, a rural settlement in Sumy Oblast

== Villages ==
- Yampil, Lviv Oblast, a village in Lviv Oblast
- Yampil, Cherkasy Oblast, a village in Cherkasy Oblast

== Hromada ==
- Yampil settlement hromada

== See also ==
- Yampolsky
