= Atlantic Symphony Orchestra =

Canadian professional symphony orchestra

The Atlantic Symphony Orchestra (ASO) was a professional Canadian symphony orchestra in Atlantic Canada that was active during the second half the 20th century. It was unusual in that it was the only full-time regional professional orchestra in Canadian history.

== History ==
The orchestra was formed shortly after the demise of both the Halifax Symphony Orchestra and New Brunswick Symphony Orchestra. This left Canada's Atlantic region without a full-time professional symphony orchestra. The ASO was established by joint committees in Halifax, Sydney, Saint John, Moncton, and Fredericton on 12 June 1968. Many of the committee members had been previously associated with the two disbanded orchestras.

The new orchestra's first conductor was Klaro Mizerit; he led the orchestra from 1968 until 1977. With an emphasis on Canadian compositions, the orchestra made several commercial recordings in the 1970s and was featured on many broadcasts on CBC Radio.

Conductor Victor Yampolsky led the orchestra from 1977 until 1983, at which time it was disbanded because of financial problems. A smaller group, Symphony Nova Scotia, continued to perform with some of the same musicians.

== Discography ==
- Atlantic Symphony Orchestra / Orchestre Symphonique Atlantique, 1970, Independent
- The Atlantic Symphony Orchestra Conducted By Klaro Mizerit and Kenneth Elloway, 1972, CBC Radio Canada
- The Picasso Suite, 1975, CBC Radio Canada
