= Kelleigh Bannen =

American singer-songwriter

- Born: Kelleigh Carlyle Bannen; February 18, 1981 (age 45); Nashville, Tennessee
- Origin: Nashville, Tennessee, U.S.
- Genres: Country
- Occupation: Singer
- Instrument: Vocals
- Years active: 2008-present
- Labels: Carlyle, EMI Nashville, Whiskey Rain
- Website: www.kelleighbannen.net

Kelleigh Carlyle Bannen (born February 18, 1981) is an American country music singer and host of Apple Music's Beats 1 "Today's Country" radio show. She debuted in 2012 with the single "Sorry on the Rocks", which charted on Hot Country Songs and received positive reviews. Her second single, "Famous", charted in 2014, followed by "You Are What You Love". Bannen's album, "Favorite Colors", was released in 2019, produced by Jaren Johnston.

== Family life ==
Kelleigh Carlyle Bannen was born February 18, 1981, in Nashville, Tennessee. When she was just 5 years old, she started playing the violin. Her first violin was made out of a Cracker Jack box and a paint stirrer. Her brother, Thomas Grant, died on her birthday in 2008 of a drug overdose. Subsequent to that Kelleigh embarked on a memory tour benefiting the Hazelden Foundation, which in 2014 merged with the Betty Ford Center, to become the Hazelden Betty Ford Foundation. She also began advocating for AA, and the National Council on Alcoholism and Drug Dependence.

Kelleigh is the host of the podcast "This Nashville Life" alongside producer, Kevin Sokolnicki. On October 29, 2019, Kelleigh made her national television debut on the Today show with Hoda and Jenna.

== Discography ==
=== Albums ===
Title	Album details
Radio Skies	Release date: 2008; Label: Carlyle; Format: CD
Cheap Sunglasses	Release date: 2016; Label: Whiskey Rain; Format: CD
The Joneses	Release date: 2018; Label: Whiskey Rain; Format: Digital
Favorite Colors	Release date: 2019; Label: Whiskey Rain; Format: Digital
Christmas Is Coming	Release date: 2020; Label: Whiskey Rain; Format: Digital

=== Singles ===
Year	Single	Peak chart positions	
Year	Single	US Country	US Country Airplay
2012	"Sorry on the Rocks"	48	41
2014	"Famous"	46	49
2014	"You Are What You Love"	—	59
2014	"Smoke When I Drink"	—	—
2017	"Church Clothes"	—	—
2019	"Deluxe"	—	—
2019	"Faith in You"	—	—
2019	"Boys Don't Cry"	—	—
2019	"Diamonds"	—	—
2020	"The Optimist"	—	—
2023	"I Know Better Now"	—	—

=== Music Videos ===
Year	Title	Director
2012	"Sorry on the Rocks"	Jim Wright
2014	"Famous"	Hannah Lux Davis
2014	"Smoke When I Drink"	Reid Long
2016	"Landlocked"	Blythe Thomas
2016	"Once Upon A"	Blythe Thomas
2016	"All Good Things"	Blythe Thomas
2016	"Cheap Sunglasses"	Blythe Thomas
2016	"Welcome to the Party"	Blythe Thomas
2017	"Church Clothes"	Michael Monaco
2018	"Happy Birthday"	Evan Kauffman
2019	"Deluxe"	Carlos Ruiz
2019	"Faith in You"	Carlos Ruiz
2019	"Boys Don't Cry"	Carlos Ruiz
2019	"Diamonds"	Carlos Ruiz
2020	"Suit"	Rachel Deeb
