= Holland Performing Arts Center =

Performance art venue in Omaha, Nebraska, U.S.

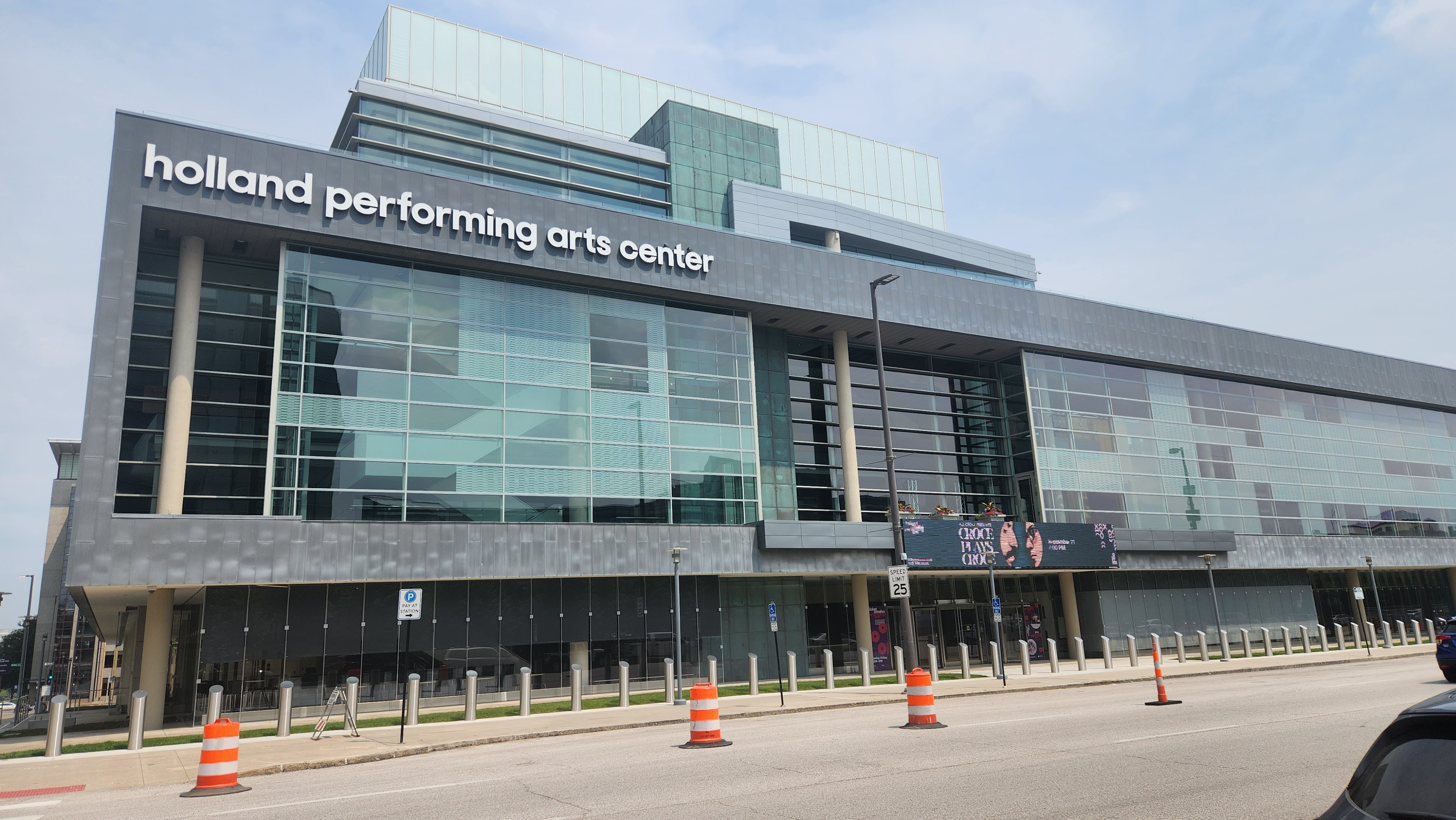
- Holland Center in 2025
- Interactive map of the Holland Performing Arts Center area

General information
- Status: Completed
- Location: Omaha, Nebraska, U.S.
- Coordinates: 41.259158795835305°N 95.93267973210862°W
- Completed: October 21, 2005
- Owner: Omaha Performing Arts

Design and construction
- Architect: HDR, Inc. in collaboration with Ennead Architects

The Holland Performing Arts Center is a performing arts facility located on 13th and Douglas Streets in Downtown Omaha, Nebraska, United States. Opened in October 2005, it was designed by Omaha architectural firm HDR, Inc. in collaboration with Ennead Architects. The center is owned and managed by Omaha Performing Arts, and specializes in events requiring an environment with good acoustics, including performances by touring jazz, blues and popular entertainers, as well as the Omaha Symphony Orchestra and Omaha Area Youth Orchestra. Kirkegaard Associates provided acoustics consulting and New York firm Fisher Dachs Associates provided theater planning and design consultation.

== History ==
In March 2001, the Holland Performing Arts Center was announced alongside plans to renovate the Orpheum Theatre. In October 2001, it was announced that it would occupy the site that formerly belonged to a Swanson food plant. In February 2002, Mary and Richard Holland donated $90 million for the performance art center, later becoming the namesake.

The former food plant buildings were imploded in late 2002. During demolition, parts of the former facilities collapsed on the Frankie Pane Building, which destroyed the building. Additionally, the Christian Specht Building was also slated for demolition. Since it was listed on the National Register of Historic Places, plans fell through, and the eastern portion of the block was kept.

Ground was broken for the then-Omaha Performing Arts Center in April 2003. An additional bond issue was created to help fund the performing arts center in December 2003. The Holland Performing Arts Center officially opened on October 21, 2005.

In 2016, the Christian Specht Building was again threatened with demolition. Omaha Performing Arts claimed that there was a parking crisis and wanted to build a parking garage and additional expansion on the site of the building. Plans again received extensive opposition and criticism from the public and then Omaha mayor-Jean Stothert. Omaha Performing Arts later cancelled the parking garage plan the following year.

In 2023, construction began on an expansion to the Dick & Mary Holland Campus known as the Tenaska Center for Arts Engagement. The building was built adjacent to Holland Performing Arts Center and will primarily be used by it and other properties owned by Omaha Performing Arts. It is expected to be complete by April 2026.

== Performance and other facilities ==
The Center includes several performance areas. The Peter Kiewit Concert Hall seats 2,005 and has a stage size of 64 feet by 48 feet; it is modeled after European "shoebox" shaped halls. The Suzanne and Walter Scott Recital Hall is a "black box" space with seating for 486 people and a stage size of 40 feet by 32 feet. The Courtyard is a semi-closed area for events, with a capacity of 1,000 people.

== See also ==
- The Orpheum
- List of concert halls
