= Schermerhorn Symphony Center =

Concert hall in Nashville

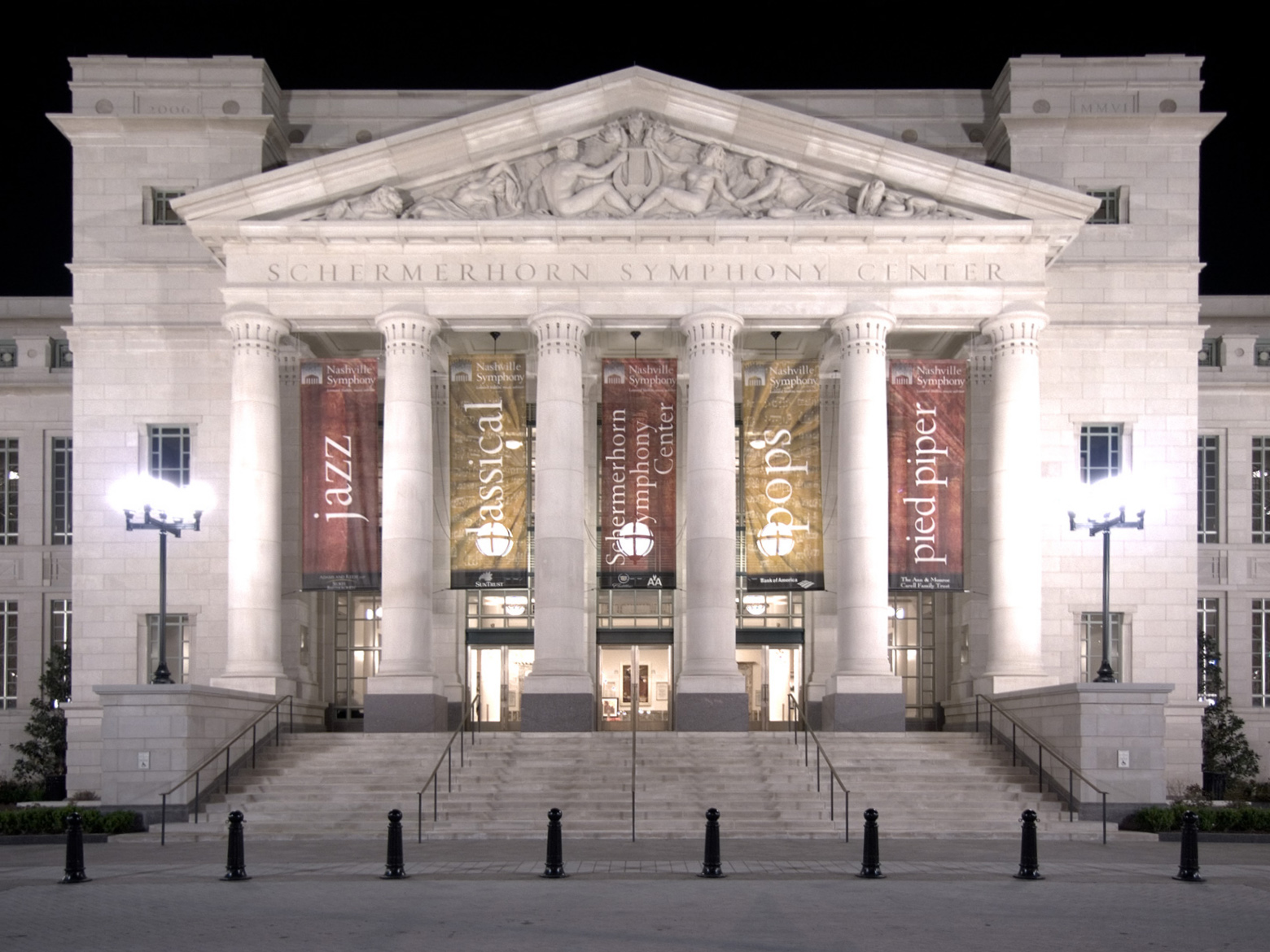
- Schermerhorn main entrance in 2007

- Location within Tennessee
- Address: One Symphony Place; Nashville, Tennessee; 37201-2031
- Coordinates: 36°9′35″N 86°46′31″W
- Owner: Nashville Symphony
- Operator: Nashville Symphony
- Capacity: 1,844 (Laura Turner Concert Hall)
- Type: Concert hall
- Field size: 197,000 sq ft (18,300 m^{2})

Construction
- Groundbreaking: December 3, 2003
- Built: April 26, 2005
- Opened: September 9, 2006
- Cost: US$123.5 million
- Architects: Earl Swensson Associates; David M. Schwarz Architects; Hastings Architecture Associates
- Project manager: Donnell Consultants
- Structural engineer: KSi Structural Engineers
- Services engineers: I.C. Thomasson & Associates, Akustiks, Fisher Dachs Associates
- General contractors: American Constructors, Inc.

Tenant
- Nashville Symphony (2006-present)

Website
- www.nashvillesymphony.org

Schermerhorn Symphony Center is a concert hall in downtown Nashville, Tennessee. Ground was broken on December 3, 2003. The center formally opened on September 9, 2006, with a gala concert conducted by Leonard Slatkin and broadcast by PBS affiliates throughout the state. The center is named in honor of Kenneth Schermerhorn (/ˈskɜːrmərhɔːrn/ SKUR-mər-horn), who was the music director and conductor of the Nashville Symphony from 1983 until his death in 2005; the center was named before maestro Schermerhorn's death.

== Architecture and design ==
At the heart of Schermerhorn Symphony Center is the 30,000 square feet (2,800 m^{2}), 1,844-seat Laura Turner Concert Hall, which is home to the Nashville Symphony. The hall is of the shoebox style. It features natural lighting, which streams in through 30 soundproof, double-paned clerestory windows. Intricate symbolic motifs appear throughout the hall and the rest of the center, including irises (the Tennessee state flower), horseshoes (a tribute to the late Laura Turner's love of horses) and coffee beans (representing Nashville's Cheek family, which played a key role in the founding of the Nashville Symphony and also originally owned the Maxwell House Coffee brand).

Seats in Laura Turner Concert Hall are distributed over three levels, including a special choral loft behind the stage that can seat up to 146 chorus members; the seats are made available to audience members during non-choral performances. The stage can accommodate up to 115 musicians. The hall also features the custom-built Martin Foundation Concert Organ, crafted by Schoenstein & Co. of San Francisco, which has 47 voices, 64 ranks, and 3,568 pipes with three 32-foot stops.

The center's New Classical design blends elements of other Classical and Neoclassical structures in the city, such as the full-scale Parthenon replica and Nashville's main public library.

The building's interior incorporates technological and acoustical features. The orchestra-level seats are mounted on motorized wagons that can be driven forward and lowered through the floor on a system of lifts, revealing an ornate Brazilian cherry and hickory parquet floor. These "chair-wagons" enable the concert hall to be converted into a 5,700-square-foot (530 m^{2}) ballroom in approximately two hours. Dozens of motorized acoustic drapes and panels can be quickly adjusted to accommodate many styles of acoustic and amplified music. The Laura Turner Concert Hall is insulated from exterior noise by an acoustical isolation joint, a 2-inch gap of air that encircles the hall and prevents transmission of sound waves in or out.

Schermerhorn Symphony Center also houses the Mike Curb Family Music Education Hall, a 2,438-square-foot (226.5 m^{2}) space that hosts smaller performances and also serves as a venue for the symphony's ongoing music-education initiative, Music Education City. The center also has a public garden, the Martha Rivers Ingram Garden Courtyard, which is enclosed by a colonnade and is connected to the west side of the building. Because of the variety of interior spaces, which also include several lobbies and the Allen Walter Watson Sr. Founders Hall, the center is frequently used for public and private events.

The firm of the 2015 Driehaus Prize winner, David M. Schwarz Architects, Inc., of Washington, D.C., designed the center, with Earl Swensson Associates of Nashville as architect of record. Paul Scarbrough of Akustiks was responsible for the acoustic design of the hall.

== Awards and honors ==
In 2009, Schermerhorn Symphony Center was recognized as one of 25 North and South American finalists in the Urban Land Institute's (ULI) Awards for Excellence. Presented annually, these awards honor building projects for superior design, for sound building practices and for making meaningful contributions to their communities.

== History ==
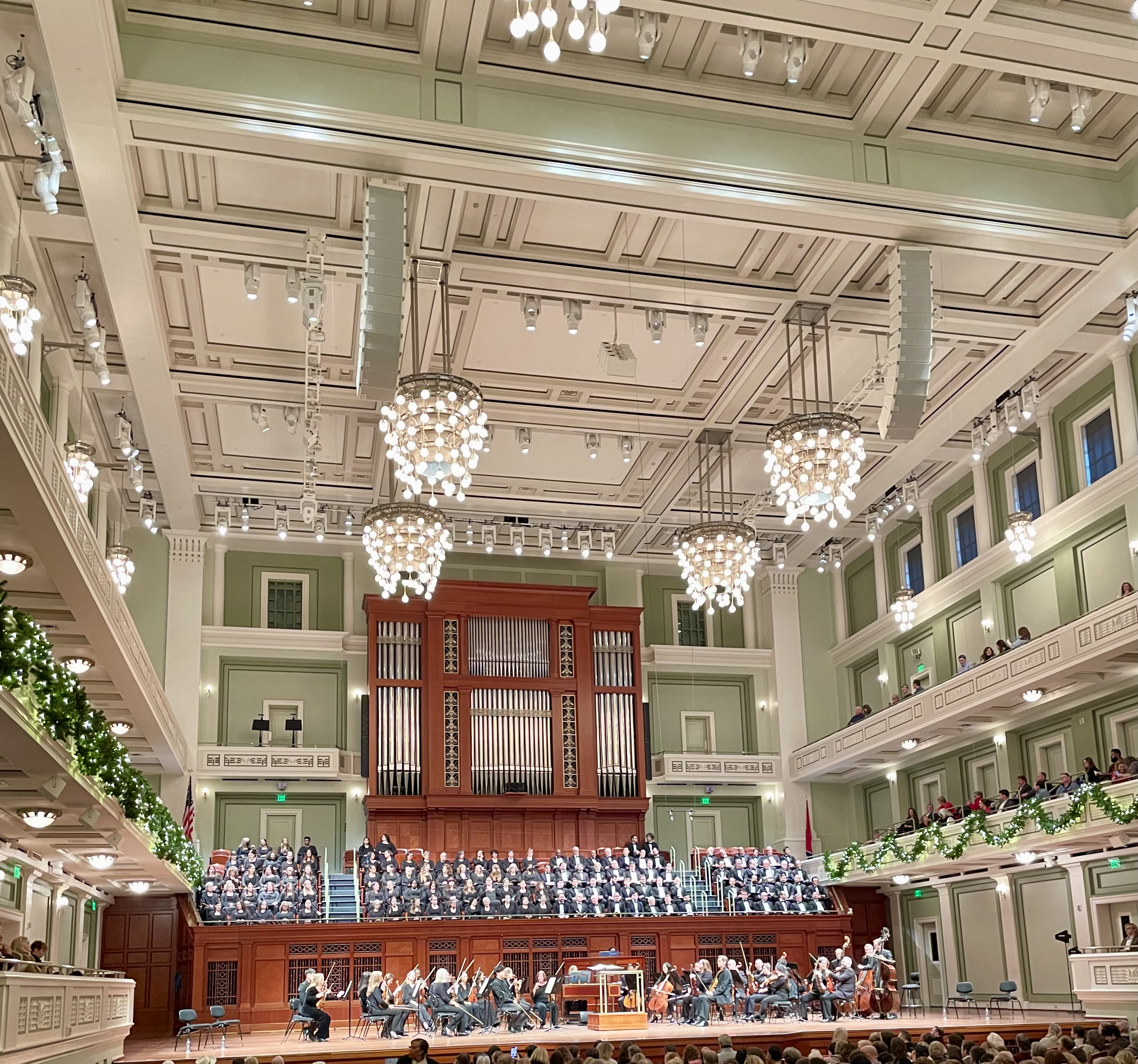
Interior of the concert hall

In May 2010, unusually severe flooding caused significant damage in and around Nashville, including approximately $40 million in damages to Schermerhorn Symphony Center. At the height of the flood, the lower reaches of the building were filled with 24 feet (7.3 m) of water. Among the losses were electrical and mechanical equipment, a large kitchen, and numerous instruments. Significant instrument losses included two Steinway & Sons pianos and the blower and console units of the Schoenstein pipe organ. Repairs to the center began almost immediately, and it reopened less than eight months later with a concert featuring Itzhak Perlman on December 31, 2010. The organ restoration was completed in time for a May 2011 concert by organist Cameron Carpenter.

On June 6, 2013, media reported that Bank of America had issued formal notice of foreclosure of the Center against the Nashville Symphony Orchestra, which, at that time, owed US$82.3 million on the building and had suffered an $11.7 million loss in fiscal year 2012. An auction of the Center was scheduled for June 28, 2013, but a deal struck through negotiation as well as equity provided by philanthropist Martha Ingram reduced the organization's debt to around $20 million and canceled the auction.

== See also ==
- List of concert halls
