= Nashville Symphony =

American symphony orchestra

- Orchestra
- official logo
- Founded: 1946
- Concert hall: Schermerhorn Symphony Center
- Principal conductor: Leonard Slatkin
- Website: www.nashvillesymphony.org

The Nashville Symphony is an American symphony orchestra, based in Nashville, Tennessee. The orchestra is resident at the Schermerhorn Symphony Center.

== History ==
In 1920, prior to the 1946 founding of the Nashville Symphony, a group of amateur and professional musicians established an orchestral ensemble in Nashville, electing Nashville Banner music critic and Vanderbilt University professor George Pullen Jackson to serve as their president and manager. Despite steady growth over the next decade, that organization fell victim to The Depression. In 1945, World War II veteran and Nashville native Walter Sharp returned home from the war intent on establishing a new symphony for Middle Tennessee. With the assistance of a small number of fellow music lovers, he convinced community leaders of this need and the Nashville Symphony was founded.

Sharp retained William Strickland, a young conductor from New York, to serve as its first music director and conductor. The orchestra performed its first concert in the fall of 1946 at War Memorial Auditorium in downtown Nashville. Over the ensuing five seasons, Strickland was responsible for setting the high performance standards that the orchestra and its conductors have maintained to this day. Guy Taylor (1951–1959), Willis Page (1959–1967), Thor Johnson (1967–1975) and Michael Charry (1976–1982) were successive music directors. During Charry's tenure, the symphony moved its subscription series from War Memorial Auditorium to Jackson Hall in the Tennessee Performing Arts Center.

Beginning in 1983, Kenneth Schermerhorn served as music director of the orchestra for 22 years, until his death in April 2005. The orchestra's profile increased during his tenure through recordings, television broadcasts and an East Coast tour, which culminated in a performance at Carnegie Hall on September 25, 2000. Following Schermerhorn's death, the orchestra name Leonard Slatkin its artistic advisor in 2006, for a contract of three years, through 2009.

In September 2006, the symphony opened Schermerhorn Symphony Center, a $123.5 million project, which includes Laura Turner Concert Hall. Slatkin conducted the orchestra's first concert in the new hall on September 9, 2006, which included works by Shostakovich, Barber and Mahler, and a world premiere Triple Concerto by Bela Fleck, Zakir Hussain and Edgar Meyer.

In September 2007, the orchestra announced the appointment Giancarlo Guerrero as the seventh music director of the Nashville Symphony, effective with the 2009–2010 season, with an initial contract for 5 years. Under his direction, the orchestra has received a number of awards, including the 2011 ASCAP award for Programming of Contemporary Music, the 2013 ASCAP award for Programming of Contemporary Music and National Endowment for the Arts grants supporting its commitment to American music. The orchestra's recordings have also earned a number of Grammy Awards and nominations (see Recordings below).

In March 2019, the orchestra announced the appointment of Enrico Lopez-Yañez as Principal Pops Conductor of the Nashville Symphony after serving as the assistant conductor since 2017.

In June 2020, in the wake of the COVID-19 pandemic, the orchestra announced the suspension of its concert activities through July 31, 2021, and the furlough of 79 musicians, 49 staff members, and Guerrero on July 1, 2020.

In June 2023, Guerrero announced his intention to conclude his tenure as music director of the Nashville Symphony at the close of the 2024–2025 season, and subsequently to take the title of music director laureate for the 2025–2026 season. In July 2025, the orchestra announced the re-appointment of Slatkin as its music advisor, effective with the 2025–2026 season, for a term of three seasons. In February 2026, the orchestra announced the appointment of Slatkin as its next music director, effective with the 2026–2027 season, with a set tenure through the 2028–2029 season.

In September 2026, the orchestra announced the suspension of their 2026–2027 season and furloughed staff due to facing significant financial hardship. They had stated that they didn't have the money on hand to continue running operations at their current level, facing a $10 million deficit. A week after this announcement, the 2026–2027 season was reinstated after Oracle partnered with the symphony, gifting them $10 million.

== Music directors ==
- William Strickland (1946–1951)
- Guy Taylor (1951–1959)
- Willis Page (1959–1967)
- Thor Johnson (1967–1975)
- Michael Charry (1976–1982)
- Kenneth Schermerhorn (1983–2005)
- Giancarlo Guerrero (2009–2025)
- Leonard Slatkin (2026–present)

=== Other conductors in leadership positions ===
- Leonard Slatkin (artistic advisor, 2006–2009, 2025–2026)

== Recordings ==
For the Naxos label, the orchestra has made more than 30 recordings since the year 2000. Several of these CDs have garnered a total of 26 Grammy Award nominations and 14 Grammy Awards. In 2008, the orchestra's CD of the music of Joan Tower, Made in America, won 3 Grammy Awards, including Best Orchestral Performance and Best Classical Album. In 2011, the orchestra's CD of music by Michael Daugherty, "Deus Ex Machina," won 3 Grammy Awards, and the following year its recording of music by Christopher Rouse, "Concerto for Percussion and Orchestra," earned one Grammy Award. The orchestra's 2016 recording of works by Jennifer Higdon earned two Grammy Awards and most recently their recording of "Christopher Rouse – Symphony No. 5" won the Grammy Award for Best Contemporary Classical Composition.

- Abraham Lincoln Portraits, featuring works by Charles Ives, Aaron Copland, Roy Harris and others (2009)
- Adams: My Father Knew Charles Ives – Harmonielehre (2021)
- Beach: "Gaelic" Symphony; Piano Concerto (2003)
- Beethoven: Missa Solemnis, Op. 123 (2004)
- Beethoven: Symphony No. 7 (1996)
- Bernstein: Dybbuk / Fancy Free (complete ballets) (2006)
- Bernstein: West Side Story: The Original Score (2002)
- Carter: Symphony No. 1; Piano Concerto (2004)
- Chadwick: Orchestral Works Thalia / Melpomene / Euterpe (2002)
- Corigliano: A Dylan Thomas Trilogy (2008)
- Daugherty: Metropolis Symphony; Deus ex Machina (2009)
- "Danielpour: Darkness in the Ancient Valley" (2013)
- "Fleck: The Impostor" (2013)
- Gershwin: Porgy and Bess (Original 1935 Production Version) (2006)
- Gould: Fall River Legend; Jekyll and Hyde Variations (2005)
- Hanson: Orchestral Works, Vol. 1 (2000)
- Harbison: Requiem (2018)
- Higdon – All Things Majestic (2016)
- Ives: Symphony No. 2; Robert Browning Overture (2000)
- Kernis: Color Wheel (2020)
- Leshnoff: Symphony No. 4 "Heichalos" (2019)
- Menotti: Amahl and the Night Visitors (2008)
- Mussorgsky: Pictures at an Exhibition (Compiled by Leonard Slatkin) (2008)
- "Paulus: Three Places of Enlightenment" (2014)
- "Piazzolla: Sinfonía Buenos Aires" (2010)
- Picker: Opera Without Words (2020)
- Ravel: L'Enfant et les sortilèges; Shéhérazade (2009)
- Riley: The Palmian Chord Ryddle / At the Royal Majestic (2017)
- Rouse: Symphony No.5 (2020)
- "Schwantner: Chasing Light..." (2011)
- "Sierra: Sinfonía No. 4" (2013)
- So There with Ben Folds (2015)
- Ticheli, Warnaar & Ranjbaran: Wind Concertos (2018)
- Tower: Made in America / Tambor / Concerto for Orchestra (2007)
- Riders in the Sky: Lassoed Live at the Schermerhorn (2009)
- Villa-Lobos: Bachianas Brasileiras (Complete) (2005)

== Education and community engagement ==
Music education has been an integral part of the Nashville Symphony's mission for much of its existence. Early in the orchestra's history, ensembles of musicians visited local schools. The orchestra has also offered free concerts for Nashville-area students since at least the 1970s. Most recently, the orchestra launched the Accelerando program, which is designed to create opportunities for young musicians from ethnic communities underrepresented in American orchestras. The program has received funding from the Andrew W. Mellon Foundation.

== See also ==
- Nashville Symphony Fashion Show, a fund-raising event associated with the orchestra.
