= Omaha Symphony =

Professional orchestra

- Orchestra
- Founded: 1921
- Location: Omaha, Nebraska
- Concert hall: Holland Performing Arts Center
- Music director: Ankush Kumar Bahl
- Website: omahasymphony.org

Omaha Symphony is a professional orchestra performing more than 200 concerts and presentations annually in Omaha, Nebraska and throughout the orchestra's home region. The orchestra was established in 1921. It is considered a major American orchestra, classified under "Group 2" among the League of American Orchestras, which ranks symphony orchestras by annual budget, with Group 1 the largest and Group 8 the smallest. Its annual budget in 2022 was approximately $8.4 million. The orchestra's home and principal venue is the 2,005-seat Holland Performing Arts Center, the $100 million purpose-built facility designed by Polshek Partnership that opened in October 2005. In a review, The Dallas Morning News called the Holland "one of the country's best-sounding" symphony halls.

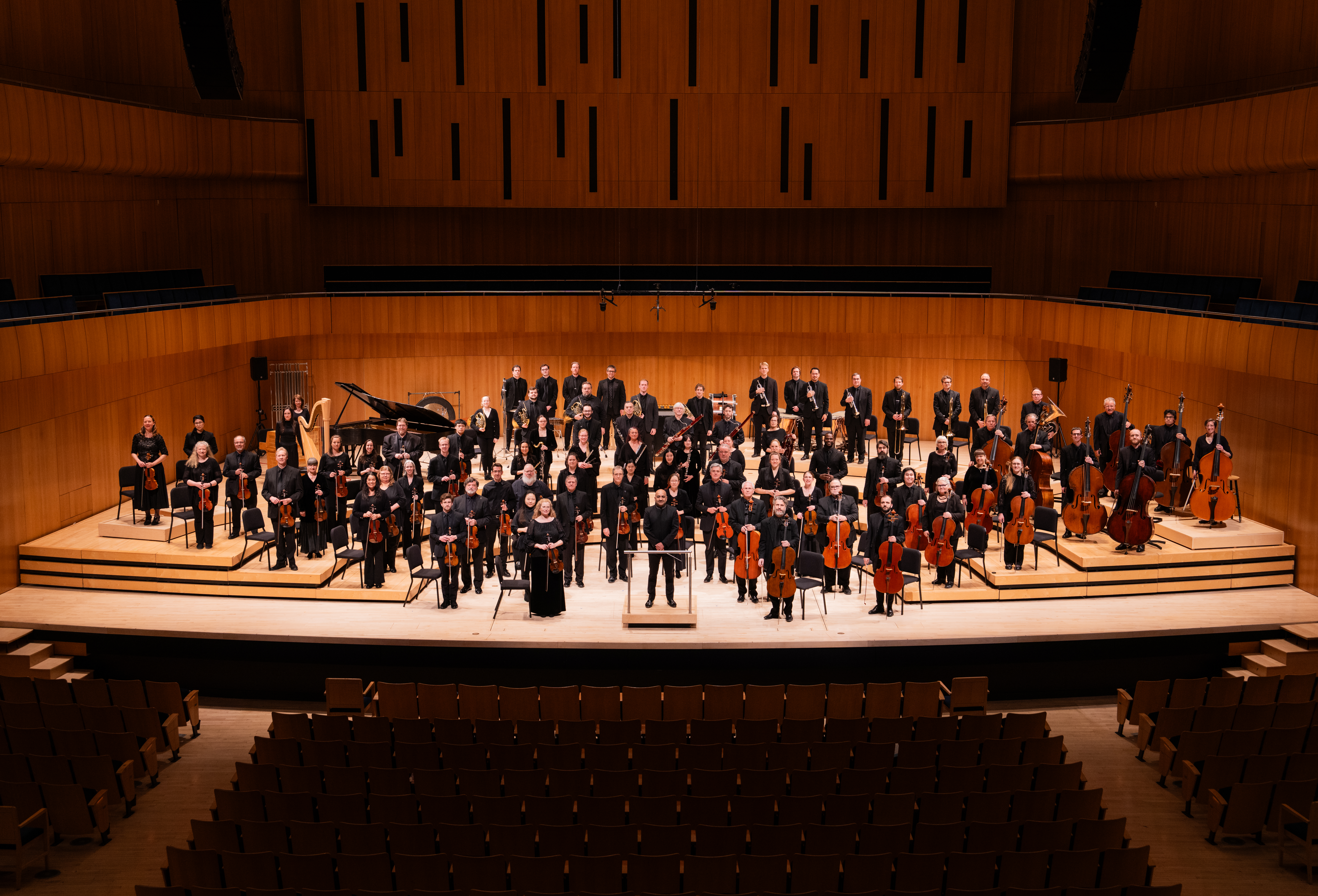
2024 Omaha Symphony Orchestra

Currently, maestro JoAnn Falletta is principal guest conductor and artistic advisor of the Omaha Symphony alongside artistic partner Ankush Kumar Bahl, who was music director from 2021 until 2025. Its music director from 2005 until 2021 was Thomas Wilkins. He also is principal guest conductor of the Hollywood Bowl Orchestra, which is under the auspices of the Los Angeles Philharmonic. Wilkins also is the Germeshausen Family and Youth Concerts conductor for the Boston Symphony Orchestra since 2011; The Boston Globe named him among the "Best People and Ideas of 2011". Before his Omaha post, Wilkins was resident conductor of the Detroit Symphony Orchestra. Since the 1992/93 season, Ernest Richardson has been the Omaha Symphony's resident conductor. Prior to coming to Omaha, Richardson was a violist with the Phoenix Symphony.

In 2002, conducted by the then-music director Victor Yampolsky, the orchestra performed the world premiere of Philip Glass's Piano Concerto No. 2: After Lewis and Clark with pianist Paul Barnes. It regularly performs with some of the world's most highly regarded musicians, including Itzhak Perlman, Pinchas Zukerman, Joshua Bell and Renée Fleming, whose 1990 performance of Maria Padilla with Opera Omaha, for which the Omaha Symphony is the resident orchestra, is considered a major debut and a springboard for her noted career.

== About ==
The Omaha Symphony presents more than 200 live performances from September through June. Its season series includes: Masterworks, Pops, Joslyn, Family, Movies, Rocks and a series of special concerts. The orchestra reaches an estimated audience of 300,000 annually; its concerts also are broadcast on radio in Omaha and throughout the region. The full orchestra includes 92 musicians.

The symphony also performs a six-concert orchestra series at the Joslyn Art Museum's Witherspoon Hall.

The orchestra also performs dozens of outreach and school concerts through its Mission: Imagination!, Concerts for Youth, and Celebrate Creativity programs, reaching more than 40,000 students and preschoolers, among others. Through its participation in the Carnegie Hall Link Up program, the Omaha Symphony reaches an additional 5,000 area youth. The symphony orchestra in 2010 won the Leonard Bernstein Award for Educational Programming, a national honor given by Ascap, or the American Society of Composers, Authors and Publishers. The award is given to an orchestra that focuses on introducing new audiences to new works.

== New music ==
On 17 March 2023, the Omaha Symphony performed a world premiere of Grammy award-nominated composer Andy Akiho's composition written to honor visual artist and Omaha icon Jun Kaneko. Commissioned by the Omaha Symphony, the work incorporated Kaneko's sculptures on stage, which Akiho played as percussive instruments.

The world premiere performance was recorded and released as an album in September 2023. The album received three Grammy nominations in 2024: Best Classical Instrumental Solo, Best Classical Compendium, and Best Contemporary Classical Composition.

The orchestra joined a consortium of thirteen American orchestras to commission and premiere a work by Grammy Award-nominated composer Zhou Tian, in commemoration of the 150th anniversary of the completion of the Transcontinental Railroad. Transcend, a three-movement symphonic work, opened the orchestra's 2019/20 season conducted by music director Thomas Wilkins on 21–22 September 2019. In its review, Omaha World-Herald called the work "A stroke of genius...The audience approved of the premiere with a standing ovation."

The orchestra commissioned and performed the world premiere of the Grammy award-winning composer Michael Daugherty's Trail of Tears flute concerto. Flautist Amy Porter performed the work with the Omaha Orchestra at its premiere on 26 March 2010.

The orchestra commissioned the 2005 Joan Tower work Purple Rhapsody, which the Omaha Symphony also performed in a world premiere in Columbus, Ohio.

In 1978, the orchestra performed the U.S. premiere of Henry Cowell's 1928 Piano Concerto conducted by then-music director Thomas Briccetti.

The symphony each year sponsors the Omaha Symphony New Music Symposium, an international call for new works. In 2012, Pulitzer Prize and Grammy-winning composer William Bolcom judged new works and offered master classes for those selected to participate. The Omaha Symphony Guild sponsors the symposium, and pays the expenses of those chosen to participate. Pulitzer Prize-winning composer Joseph Schwantner also has mentored the participating new music composers. The top prize comes with a $3,000 stipend and a recorded performance with the Omaha Symphony's Chamber Orchestra.

The orchestra each year also plays host to the Omaha Symphony Conductors Symposium, which exposes young conductors from around the world to masters of the craft.

== Guild ==
The Omaha Symphony Guild, made of community volunteers and which exists to support the symphony orchestra, has a mission to, "promote the growth and development of the Omaha Symphony Orchestra for the pleasure and education of residents of Greater Omaha and the States of Nebraska and Iowa." With a history extending since 1956, the guild has had a hand in organizing a youth symphony, community outreach events and study circles on music, among other activities throughout the region.

== Leadership ==
The music directors of the Omaha Symphony:

1. Henry Cox (1921–1924)
2. Sandor Harmati (1925–1929)
3. Joseph Littau(1930–1932)
4. Rudolph Ganz (1936–1941)
5. Richard Duncan (1940–1943, 1947–1952, 1954–1958)
6. Emil Wishnow (1952–1954)
7. Joseph Levine(1959–1969)
8. Yuri Krasnapolsky (1970–1974)
9. Thomas Briccetti(1975–1984)
10. Bruce Hangen(1984–1995)
11. Victor Yampolsky (1995–2004)
12. Thomas Wilkins (2005–2021)
13. Ankush Kumar Bahl (2021–2025)

== History ==
In 1949, trombone player Helen Jones Woods joined the Omaha Symphony but was dismissed after her father, who did not share her light complexion, picked her up from a performance, tipping off the orchestra that she was not white; she never played the trombone again.
