= Hollywood Bowl Orchestra =

Symphony orchestra in Hollywood, California

- Orchestra
- Short name: HBO
- Founded: 1990, by Ernest Fleischmann and John Mauceri
- Location: Los Angeles, California, U.S.
- Concert hall: Hollywood Bowl
- Principal conductor: Thomas Wilkins
- Website: www.laphil.com/people/hollywood-bowl-orchestra

The Hollywood Bowl Orchestra (HBO) is a symphony orchestra that is managed by the Los Angeles Philharmonic Association which holds the vast majority of its performances at the Hollywood Bowl.

John Mauceri led the orchestra from its founding in 1990 until he stepped down after the 2006 Hollywood Bowl season. During this time, his titles included conductor, principal conductor, and finally, director. He now holds the title of founding director.

In March 2008, Thomas Wilkins was named as the principal guest conductor of the orchestra for a two-year contract that would begin in the summer of 2008. The contract was extended multiple times until 2014 when Wilkins was promoted to principal conductor.

== Musicians and cross-over with other orchestras ==
The Hollywood Bowl Orchestra has 80–100 players drawn from the large pool of world-class freelance musicians in the Southern California area, many of whom perform regularly with movie studios, regional orchestras, and other entertainment-related organizations.

There is no cross-over between the Hollywood Bowl Orchestra musicians and the regular roster of the Los Angeles Philharmonic. This is in notable contrast to other orchestras of this class, namely the Boston Pops orchestra, which draws its players directly from the Boston Symphony Orchestra (i.e. the Boston Symphony without its principal players), and the Cincinnati Pops Orchestra, which prominently features only the highest-caliber musicians from its parent Cincinnati Symphony Orchestra in addition to a variety of local artists and specialists for one-off engagements.

== History ==
Since 1922, orchestras performed regularly at the Hollywood Bowl, primarily those from the Los Angeles area. In 1927, a "Hollywood Bowl Orchestra" was established under conductor Eugene Goossens. The orchestra made a series of recordings for Victor in 1928 issued as Symphonies Under the Stars, notable for being recorded in the open air. In addition to Goossens, guest conductors of these events included Alfred Hertz, Ossip Gabrilowitsch, Bruno Walter, Pierre Monteux, Pietro Crimini, Modest Altschuler, Adolf Tandler, and Vladimir Shavitch.

=== Stokowski's orchestra ===
The first incarnation of a permanent orchestra was in 1945 as the "Hollywood Bowl Symphony Orchestra" under the direction of Leopold Stokowski. They had a number of recordings under Stokowski plus others under different conductors, including:

- The music of George Gershwin, with Felix Slatkin conducting and Leonard Pennario as piano soloist
- Tchaikovsky's Piano Concerto No. 1, with William Steinberg conducting and Vladimir Horowitz as piano soloist

However, after only two seasons, the orchestra was disbanded, and all the summer orchestral concerts at the Hollywood Bowl were subsequently performed by the Los Angeles Philharmonic. Albeit, another incarnation of the Hollywood Bowl Symphony Orchestra continued into the 1950s and '60s, led by such conductors as Felix Slatkin, Miklós Rózsa, Carmen Dragon, and Alfred Newman, and made numerous recordings for Capitol Records.

=== Re-establishment in 1990 ===
On October 17, 1990, the management of the Los Angeles Philharmonic Association (LAPA) led by Ernest Fleischmann (LAPA executive VP and managing director at the time) and John Mauceri (the newly appointed principal conductor) held a press conference announcing the formation of a second orchestra under its auspices, this time titled the "Hollywood Bowl Orchestra" (HBO). There were four primary reasons for its existence:

- To relieve the Los Angeles Philharmonic from some of its responsibilities playing at the Hollywood Bowl during the summer.
- To reinvent the "pops" format. During the announcement, both Fleischmann and Mauceri took great pains to avoid the term "pops" in relation to the orchestra and/or its repertoire. Mauceri said, "This is something unique in our century, that there seems to be a division between music that is 'popular' and music that is 'serious.' This ensemble will cut across these artificial barriers to become an orchestra for all tastes." The HBO would be dedicated to the preservation of American musical heritage from movies to musicals to the concert hall.
- To record this reinvented pops repertoire. At the press conference, the orchestra announced that it had signed a 15-CD recording contract with Philips Classics; in fact, Fleischmann noted that the impetus for forming the orchestra began when Philips lost its recording contract with the Boston Pops to Sony Classical.
- To tour internationally, with the first tour set for Japan in December 1991.

=== Mauceri Years ===
The first public performances by the orchestra were for Independence Day concerts on July 2–4, 1991, at the Hollywood Bowl, with Mauceri conducting and Bruce Hubbard (baritone) as soloist. The program included works by Aaron Copland, Leonard Bernstein, John Williams, George Gershwin, and Jerome Kern, among others. John Henken's concert review in the Los Angeles Times praised Mauceri for choosing "an Americana program that was nicely paced, reasonably varied and made musical as well as patriotic points. More importantly, he got his orchestra to project it all with exuberance and flair."

During Mauceri's tenure, he and the orchestra largely fulfilled the goals announced when the orchestra was founded:

- They performed a wide variety of repertoire, from Broadway musicals to traditional "classical" works including concert performances of full operas. Mauceri frequently conducted classic and contemporary motion picture scores and performed and recorded compositions for the concert hall by musicians traditionally known only as "film composers", such as Erich Wolfgang Korngold, Miklós Rózsa, Dimitri Tiomkin, and Alfred Newman. He even re-introduced forgotten music, including the "Fanfare for the Hollywood Bowl" by Arnold Schoenberg. He became known for speaking to the audience from the stage about the evening's performance in an easy-going, educational, and entertaining way. He would also begin every concert by saying, "I'm John Mauceri. And this is the Hollywood Bowl Orchestra."
- They made 13 recordings for Philips. Among the recordings of their stated repertoire, the most noteworthy is The King and I, with Julie Andrews and Ben Kingsley in the lead roles, Lea Salonga, Peabo Bryson, and Marilyn Horne in supporting roles, and film stars Roger Moore and Martin Sheen in special cameo appearances. This was the first recording in 35 years to use the original orchestrations of the Academy Award–winning movie version. The recording reached No. 1 on the Billboard classical crossover chart in only its second week of release and also received Billboard's 1993 Crossover CD of the Year award.
- They had a number of tours: New Year's Eve concerts in December 1991, 1993, 1995, and 1997 in Japan, and November 1996 concerts in Brazil.

Over the course of more than 300 concerts, the orchestra has performed alongside classical vocalists, instrumentalists, and dance companies, including Kathleen Battle, Plácido Domingo, Jane Eaglen, Marilyn Horne, Alexander Frey, Jennifer Larmore, Sylvia McNair, Andrea Bocelli, Gil Shaham, Stephen Hough, Luciano Pavarotti, and the San Francisco Ballet. Its guest performers have spanned genres such as country, theater, pop, and rock, featuring artists including Garth Brooks—in his only performance with an orchestra—Trisha Yearwood, John Denver, Jason Alexander, Carol Burnett, Kristin Chenoweth, Kirk Douglas, Patti LuPone, Reba McEntire, Lynn Redgrave, Peabo Bryson, Harry Connick Jr., Alan Cumming, Davis Gaines, Savion Glover, Joel Grey, Garrison Keillor, Leonard Nimoy, Brian Stokes Mitchell, Patrick Stewart, Big Bad Voodoo Daddy, Chicago, Cheap Trick, The Chieftains, Sérgio Mendes, The Moody Blues, Pink Martini, Tito Puente and the Latin Jazz Ensemble, Royal Crown Revue, Rufus Wainwright, Rosemary Clooney, Natalie Cole, Ann Miller, Della Reese, George Martin, and Peter, Paul and Mary. During the 1999 season, Los Angeles Mayor Richard Riordan made his conducting debut at the Bowl with the orchestra.
