= Vlad Yanpolsky =

Russian pianist (1905–1965)

Vlad Yanpolsky (1905–1965) was a Soviet pianist who served as David Oistrakh's accompanist in several recordings.

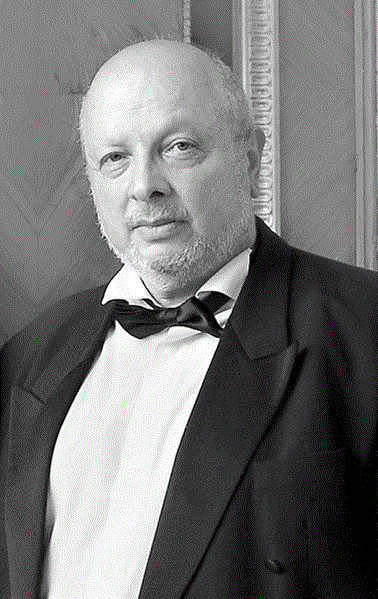
Vlad Yanpolsky
