= Thomas Wilkins (conductor) =

Music conductor

Thomas Alphonso Wilkins (born c.1956) is an American orchestra conductor. He is music director laureate of the Omaha Symphony Orchestra, Principal Conductor of the Hollywood Bowl Orchestra, Artistic Advisor, Education and Community Engagement of the Boston Symphony Orchestra, and principal guest conductor of the Virginia Symphony.

== Early life and education ==
Wilkins was born in Norfolk, Virginia and grew-up in a housing project, the son of a single mother and welfare recipient. His inspiration to become an orchestra conductor came from a performance of The Star-Spangled Banner he attended when he was eight years old.

Wilkins received a bachelor's degree in music education from the Shenandoah Conservatory in 1978, and a master of music degree in orchestral conducting from the New England Conservatory of Music in 1982.

== Teaching and conducting ==
Wilkins has taught at North Park University, the University of Tennessee at Chattanooga, and Virginia Commonwealth University.

Wilkins is Henry A. Upper Chair of Orchestral Conducting and professor of music in orchestral conducting at the Indiana University Jacobs School of Music.

He worked as assistant director of the Richmond Symphony Orchestra. He also worked as resident director of the Detroit Symphony Orchestra and The Florida Orchestra. He has directed orchestras across the United States, including the New York Philharmonic, the Chicago Symphony, the Los Angeles Philharmonic, the Cincinnati Symphony, and the National Symphony. He has served as a guest conductor for the Philadelphia and Cleveland Orchestras, the Symphonies of Atlanta, Dallas, Houston, Baltimore, San Diego, Seattle, Louisiana, North Carolina, and Utah. He has also conducted performances with the Buffalo and Rochester Philharmonics, the Grant Park Music Festival in Chicago, and others.

Wilkins has served on several boards of directors including at the Greater Omaha Chamber of Commerce, Charles Drew Health Center in Omaha, and the Center Against Spouse Abuse in Tampa Bay.

Wilkins is chairman of the board for the Raymond James Charitable Endowment Fund. He also serves as the national ambassador for the non-profit World Pediatric Project, headquartered in Richmond, Virginia.

Wilkins became music director of the Omaha Symphony in 2005, and family and youth concert conductor of the Boston Symphony in 2011. He retired from the Omaha Symphony on June 12, 2021.

== Awards and recognition ==
Following his debut season with the Boston Symphony, Wilkins was named to the "Best People and Ideas of 2011" by the Boston Globe. In 2014, he was honored with the "Outstanding Artist" award at the Nebraska Governor’s Arts Awards, and in 2018 Wilkins was the recipient of the Leonard Bernstein Lifetime Achievement Award from the Longy School of Music. In 2022, he received the League of American Orchestras’ Golden Baton Award.
