= Moon Theater =

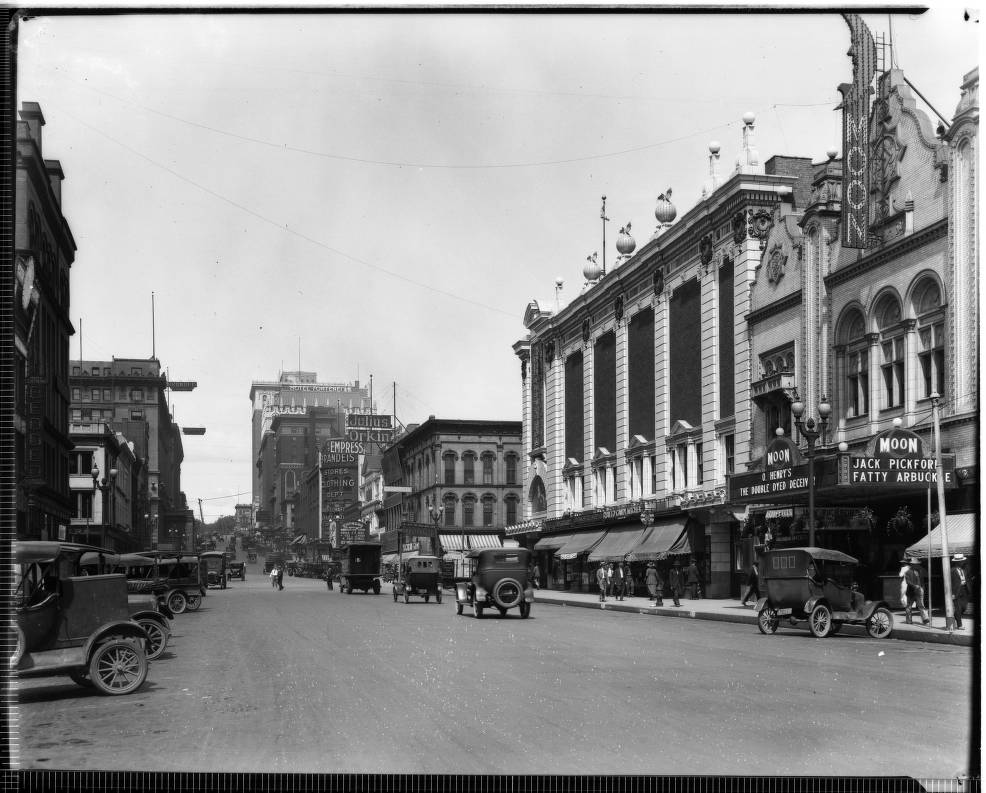
- Interactive map of the Moon Theater area
- Alternative names: Town Theater, Cooper Theater

General information
- Type: Movie theater
- Location: Omaha, Nebraska, 1410 Douglas, United States
- Coordinates: 41.258°N 95.934°W
- Opened: August 30, 1918
- Closed: June 1974
- Demolished: 1976
- Owner: World Realty Co.

Design and construction
- Architect: Harry Lawrie of Fisher & Lawrie

Other information
- Seating capacity: 1,600

The Moon Theater was a silent movie theater at 1410 Douglas Street in Downtown Omaha, Nebraska. The 1,600-seat theater was built on the site of Omaha's first movie theater, the Parlor. In later years the theater was renamed the Town Theater and eventually the Cooper Theater. The building was demolished in 1976.

== History ==
The Moon Theater was built for the World Realty Company in 1918 at 1410 Douglas Street, and was built right next door to the existing Rialto Theater. The Moon joined the company's other theaters, the Sun Theater at 1410 Farnam Street and the Muse Theater at 24th and Farnam Streets. A fourth theater, the World Theater would, in later years, join the trio.

The Moon Theater was a Moorish-style building designed by Harry Lawrie of the Omaha architectural firm of Fisher & Lawrie. The brick and steel structure boasted an exterior finish of terra cotta, white tile and marble. Over the entrance canopy hung a sign thirty-feet in height with the image of a crescent moon. The interior included decorative painted panels depicting scenes of historic interest and locations within the U.S. National Parks. Playing off the theater's name, the theater's marquee prior to its opening announced, "Moon Rises Next Sat Eve, Sessue Hayakawa in Gray Horizons".

During a promotion for The Great Air Robbery, an Essex Motors touring car built to replicate a 600-pound airplane bomber was driven through the streets of Omaha to the entry of the Moon Theater. In 1929, the Moon Theater became a Burlesque theater. In 1933, it became the Town Theater, hosting both stage shows and movies. Its first stage show under its new name was Talk o' the Town. It was remodeled in 1958 for Cinerama by the Cooper Foundation. It opened as the Cooper Theater with a showing of South Pacific, for a record 78 weeks. At the time, the South Pacific run set a record for the longest movie run. The Cinerama equipment was later moved to the Cooper Foundation's new Indian Hills Theater. The last movie shown at the Cooper Theater was Serpico in June 1974. The theater was demolished at the beginning of 1976. The Union Pacific Headquarters building occupies the lot.

== See also ==
- History of Omaha
- List of theaters in Omaha, Nebraska
- Astro Theater
- Creighton Orpheum Theater
