= Cooper Theater =

Topics referred to by the same term

Cooper Theater or Cooper Theatre may refer to:

- Cooper Cinerama Theater, a former Cinerama movie theater in Glendale, Colorado, near Denver
- Cooper Theater (St. Louis Park, Minnesota), a former Cinerama movie theater in St. Louis Park, Minnesota
- Moon Theater, a former theater in Omaha, Nebraska, later known as the Cooper Theater
- Joseph H. Cooper Theater, a theater at the University of Nebraska-Lincoln

== See also ==
- Cooper Foundation
- Cooper (disambiguation)
