= List of theaters in Omaha, Nebraska =

This is a list of theaters in Omaha, Nebraska. The entries include theaters used to present films and professional live performances, including vaudeville acts, plays and musical performances.

== Introduction ==
=== Live performance theaters ===
In 1860, the dining room of the Herndon House hosted for the first dramatic performance in Omaha, using a borrowed bolt of muslin for a curtain. Julia Dean Hayne, a leading actress of the time, played the title role. These were the humble beginnings of Omaha's performing arts scene. Today the city is home to the Omaha Community Playhouse, a nationally recognized community theater; the Holland Performing Arts Center; the beloved Orpheum Theater; and a host of other smaller performing arts venues.

=== Moving picture theaters ===
With more than 100 theaters since it was incorporated, Omaha's movie scene has never been static. Many of the early movie film theaters in Omaha were neighborhood theaters, small store-front establishments seating about 300 people on plain plywood seats. Most of the patrons of these early theaters walked to them or took street cars, so parking was not an issue. Larger theaters were congregated in Downtown Omaha, mainly along Douglas Street between Fourteenth and Sixteenth Streets, on what was called Theater Row. As personal automobile ownership increased, suburban theaters were built, and several drive-in theaters opened on what was then the outskirts of the city. Today, theater complexes with luxury seating, in-auditorium dining and bar service are prevalent. Omaha's last drive-in theater closed in 1987.

== Current theaters ==
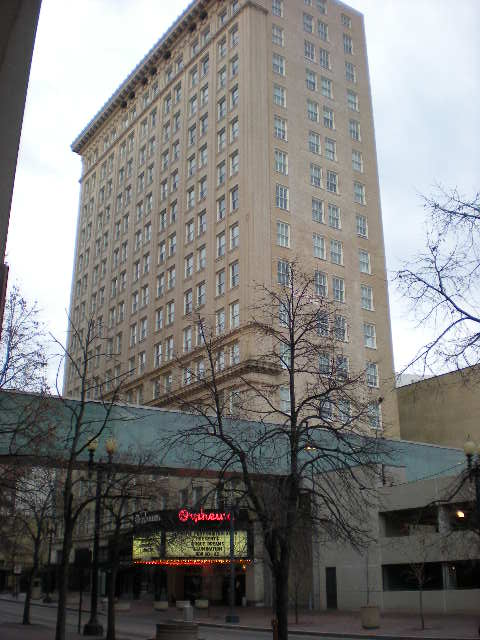
Creighton Orpheum Theater

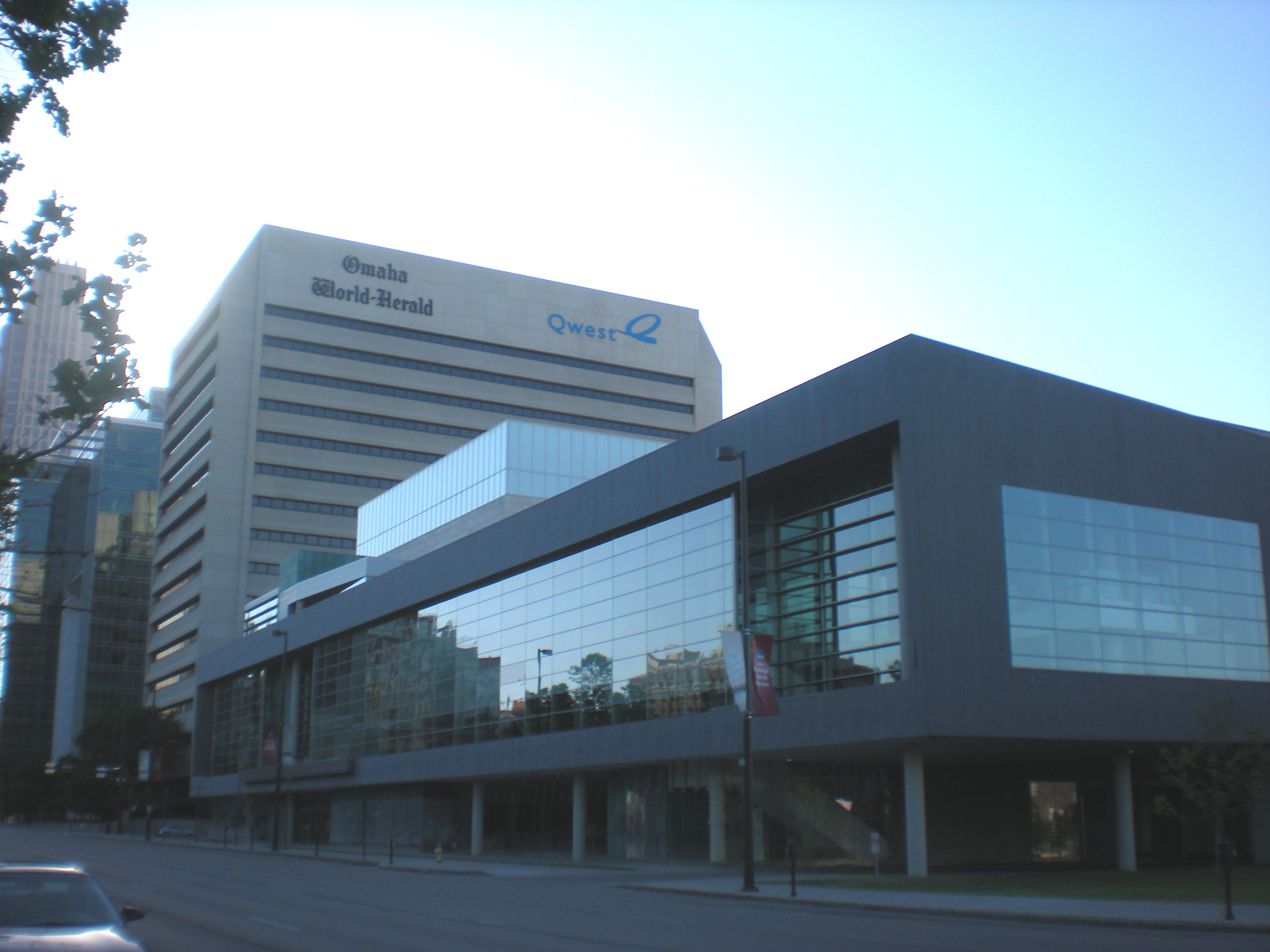
Holland Performing Arts Center

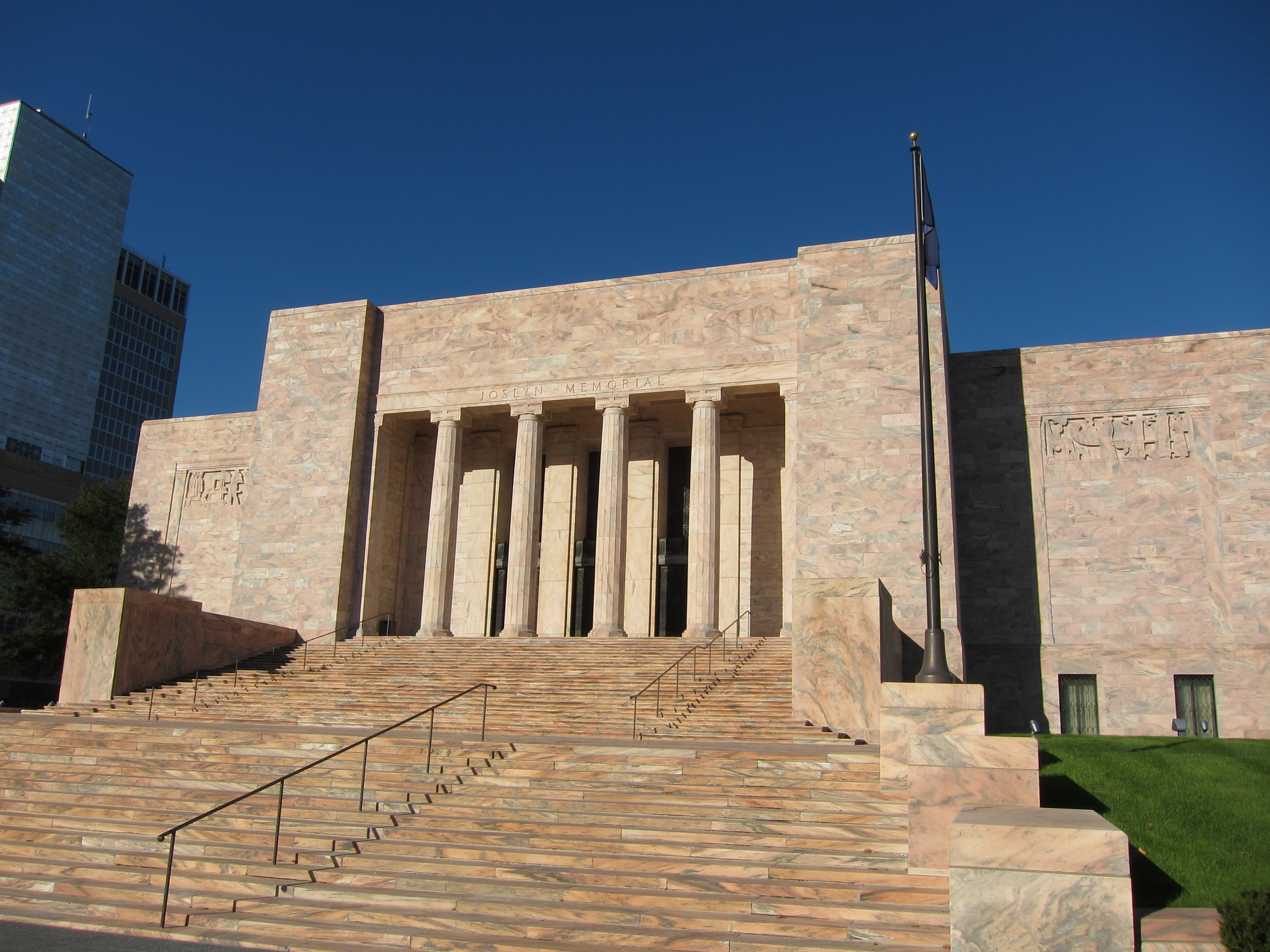
Joslyn Art Museum

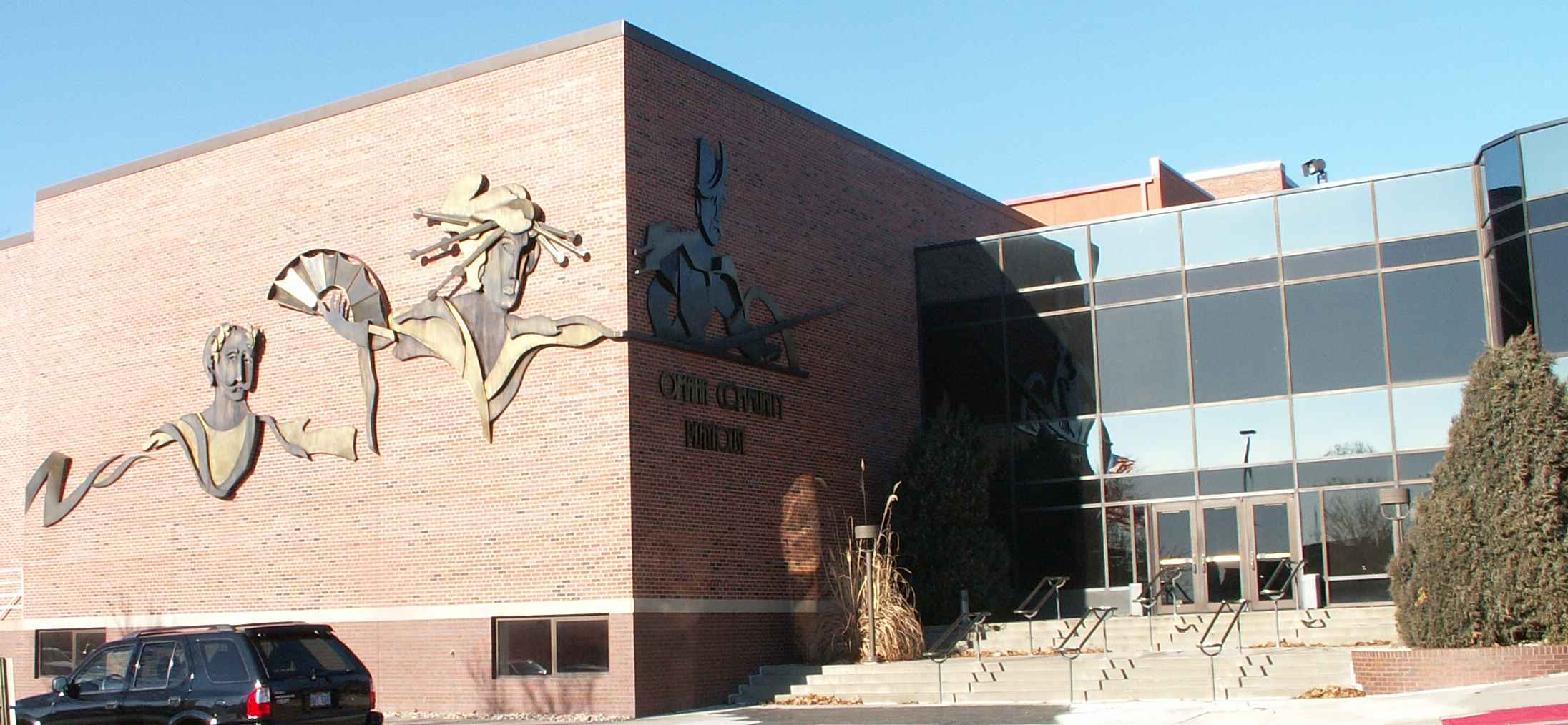
Omaha Community Playhouse

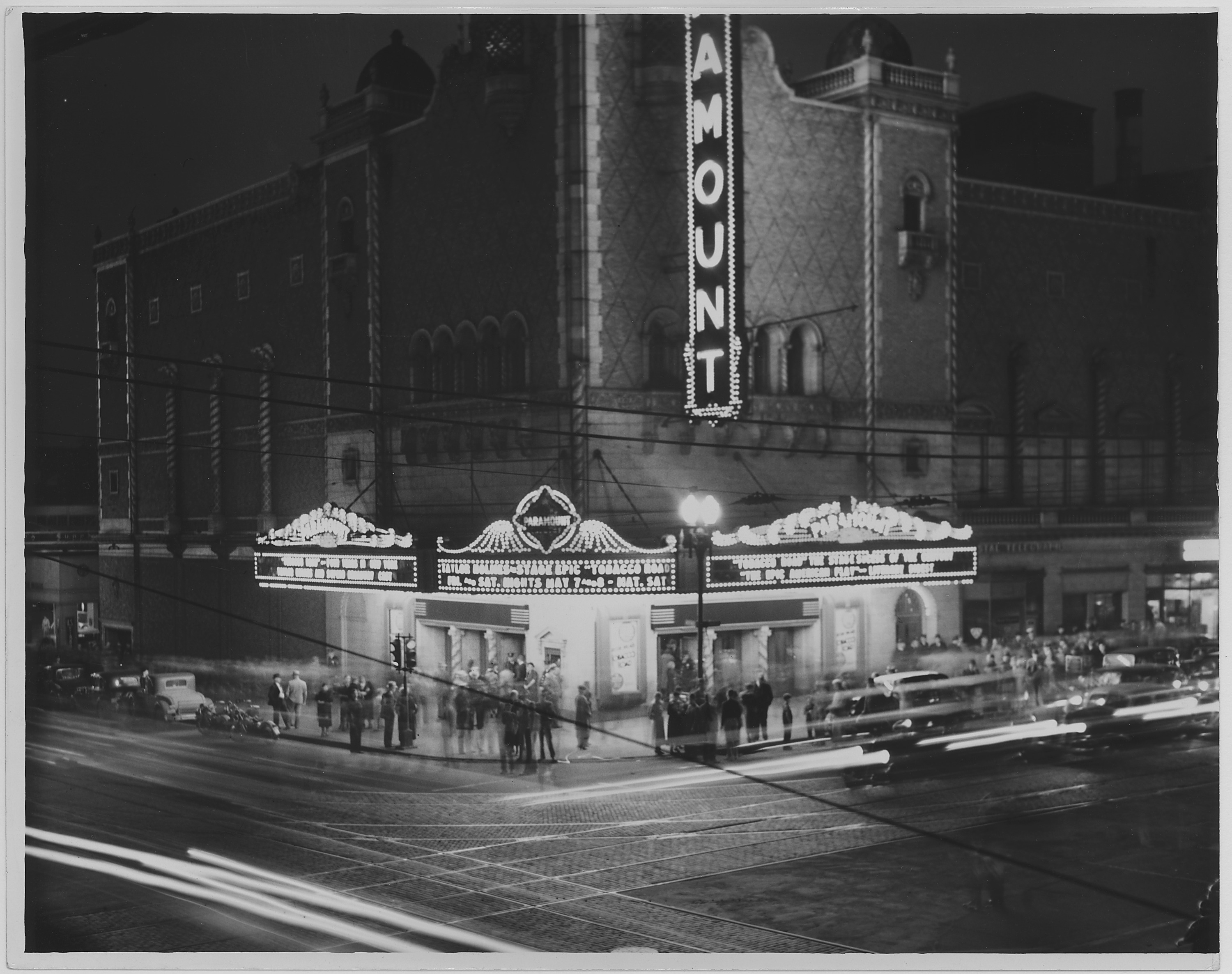
Paramount Theater, previously The Riviera, now The Rose

Current theaters in Omaha
Name	Built	Seating	Location	Notes
Aksarben Cinema	December 10, 2010		2110 South 67th Street	
Alamo Drafthouse Midtown	November 5, 2009		3201 Farnam Street	Opened as Marcus Midtown Cinema in 2009. Turned into Alamo Drafthouse Midtown in 2018.
AMC Oakview Plaza 24	1997		3555 South 140th Plaza	With 24 screens, this is the largest theater complex in Omaha.
AMC Westroads 14	November 14, 2008		10000 California Street	The theater opened as Rave Cinemas Westroads in 2008 as Omaha's first all-digital cinema. AMC Theatres purchased the theater in 2013.
Blue Barn Theatre	1980s		614 South 11th Street	This theater is in the planning stages of building a new theater space.
CHI Health Center Omaha	2003	18,320	455 North 10th Street	Opened in 2003 as Qwest Center Omaha. The original seating was 17,000. An addition in 2006 increased the facility to its current capacity. In 2011 it was renamed CenturyLink Center Omaha. CHI Health bought the naming rights in 2018.
Creighton Orpheum Theater	1927	2,600	409 South 16th Street	The original Creighton Theater was located at 408 South 15th Street, and seated 2200. It was demolished and the current theater was built on the site, with the entrance reoriented towards 16th Street. The second theater closed as a movie theater in 1971. After a major renovation, it was opened as a performing arts center in 1974. The building has continued to receive periodic renovations over the years and remains one of the top performance stages in Omaha.
Dundee Theatre	1925		4952 Dodge Street	Originally built for vaudeville and stage performances, it was converted to a movie theater in the 1930s. The theater closed in 2013, then was taken over by Film Streams and reopened in 2017 after extensive remodeling.
Great Escape Theatres	October 2006		7440 Crown Point Avenue	The theater was renamed Omaha Stadium 16 in 2013.
Holland Performing Arts Center	2005	2,000	1200 Douglas Street	
Joslyn Art Museum Concert Hall	1931	1,001		The theater is inside the museum off the Storz Fountain Court. The theater was later named the Witherspoon Concert Hall, after donor D. J. (Jim) Witherspoon.
Lozier IMAX at Omaha's Henry Doorly Zoo	March 1997	358	3701 South 10th Street	The theater premiered the IMAX film Lewis and Clark: Great Journey West in April 2002.
Marcus Majestic Cinema	1996		14304 West Maple Road	This was opened in 1996 by the Douglas Theatre Company as a 20-screen complex called the 20 Grand. In 2013 it was remodeled, reduced to 19 screens, and renamed the Marcus Majestic Cinema.
Omaha Community Playhouse	1924	758 on two stages	6915 Cass Street	This theater was previously located at 4004 Davenport Street. The company moved to its current location in 1959.
Ralston Arena	2012	3,500	7300 Q Street, Ralston	
Rose Blumkin Performing Arts Center	1926	2,776 (original seating)	2001 Farnam Street	This opened in 1926 as the Riviera Theater. In 1929, it was sold to the Paramount Company and renamed the Paramount Theater. It closed in 1957, changing hands several times before it reopened as the Astro Theater, eventually closing as a movie theater in June 1980. It was purchased by Rose Blumkin of Nebraska Furniture Mart fame. After sitting vacant for a number of years, it was restored and reopened as the Rose Blumkin Performing Arts Center.
Shelterbelt Theatre	October 1993		3225 California Street	
Sokol Auditorium	1926	1,500	2234 South 13th Street	
The Ruth Sokolof Theater	July 27, 2007	302	1340 Webster Street	A two screen theater, with one theater accommodating 96 patrons and the second accommodating 206 patrons. The theater primarily shows independent, documentary, foreign and classic films. The nonprofit arts organization, Film Streams, manages the theater.
Village Pointe Cinema	2004		304 North 174th Street	
Westwood Cinema 8	1989	1,500	2809 South 125th Avenue	Opened as Super Saver Cinema 8.

== Theaters of the past ==
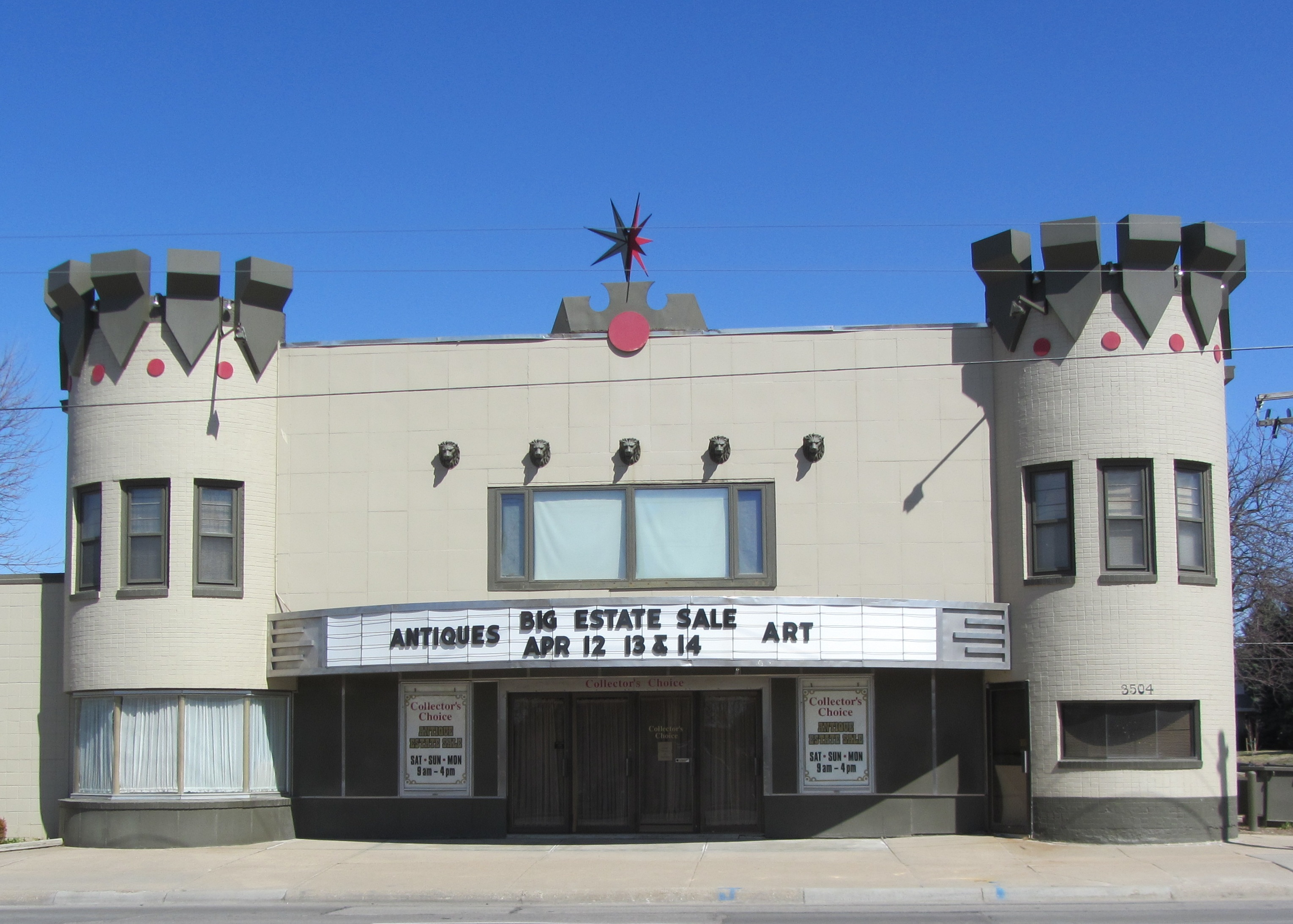
Center Theater

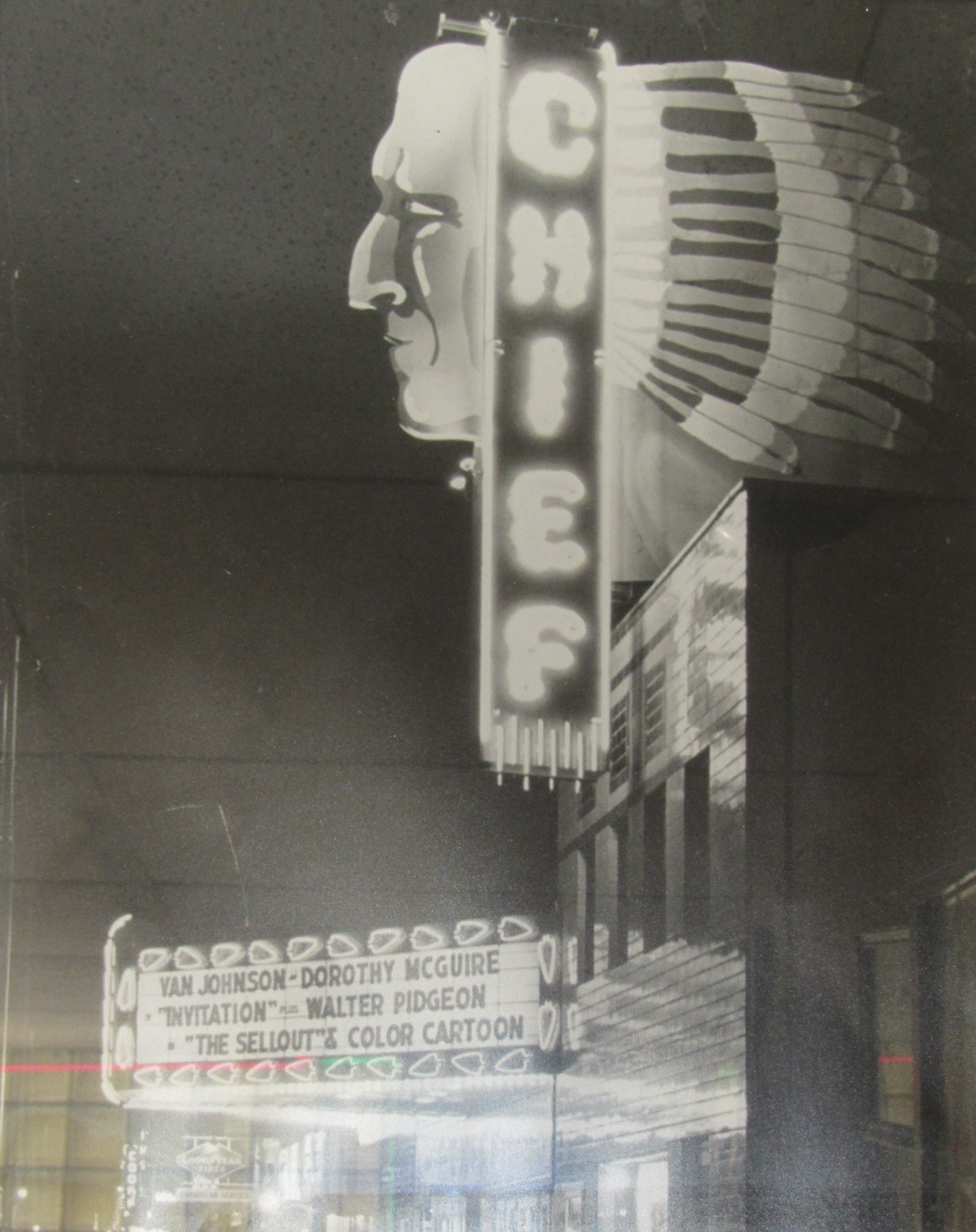
Chief Theater

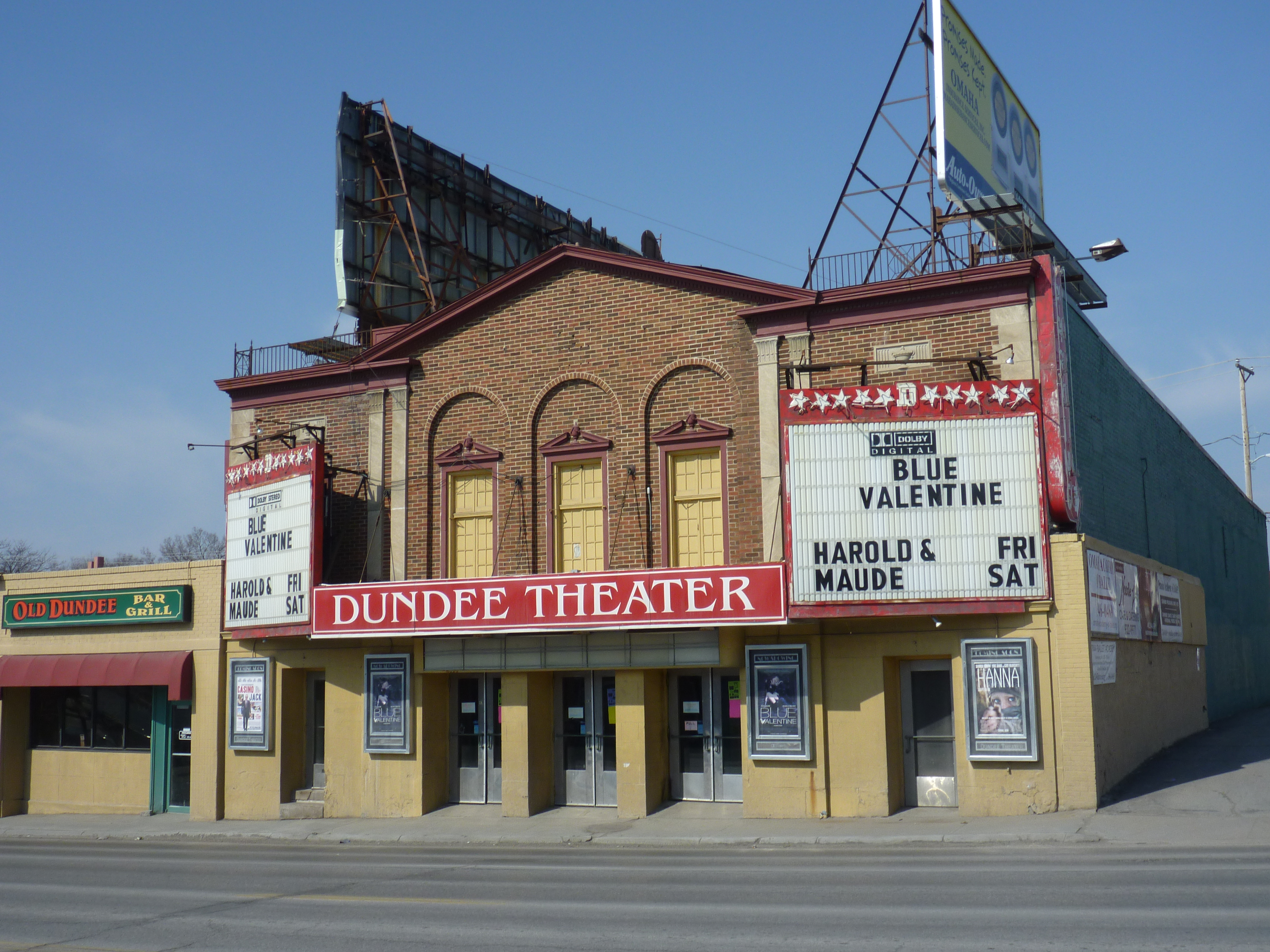
Dundee Theatre

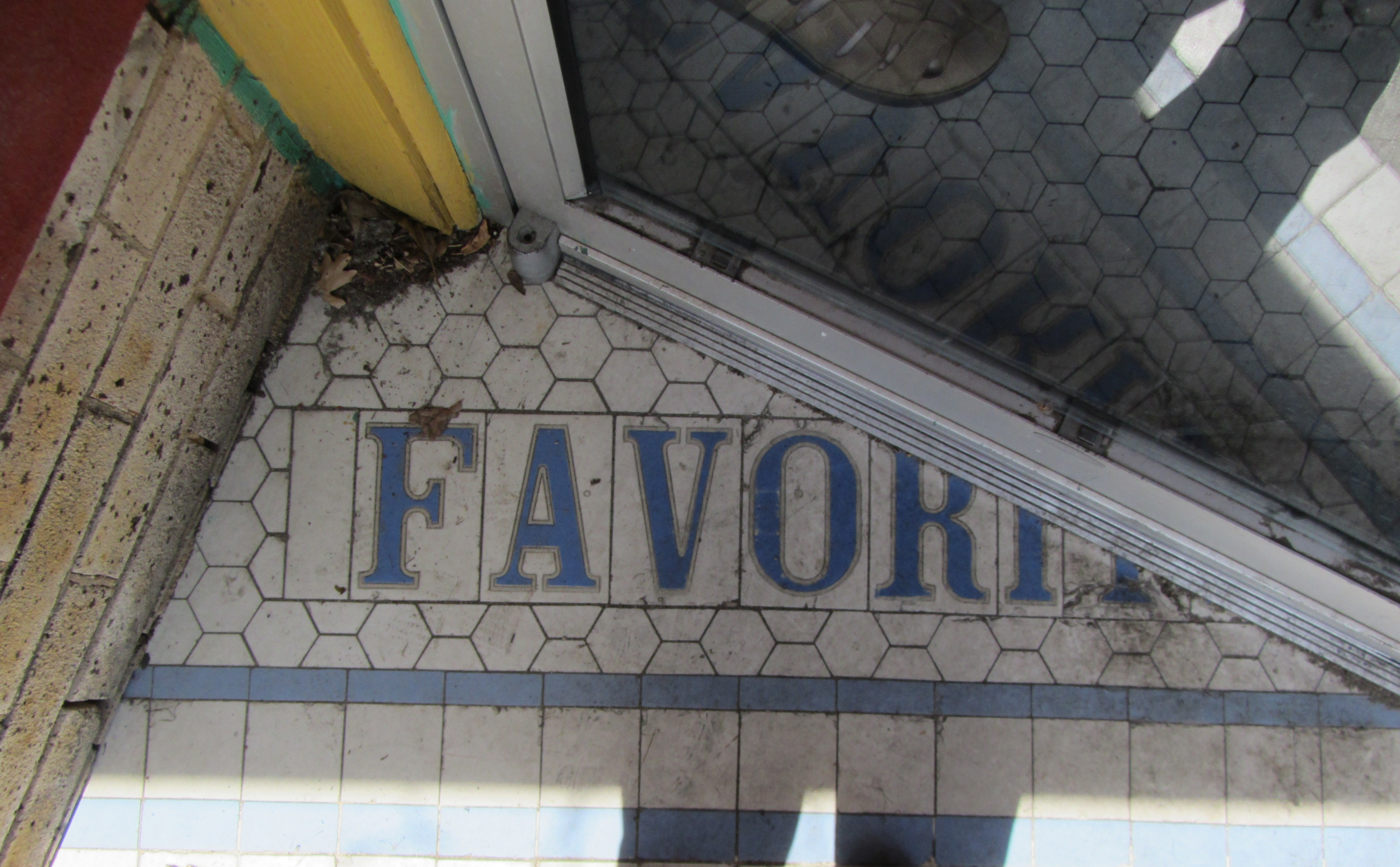
Favorite Theatre Floor

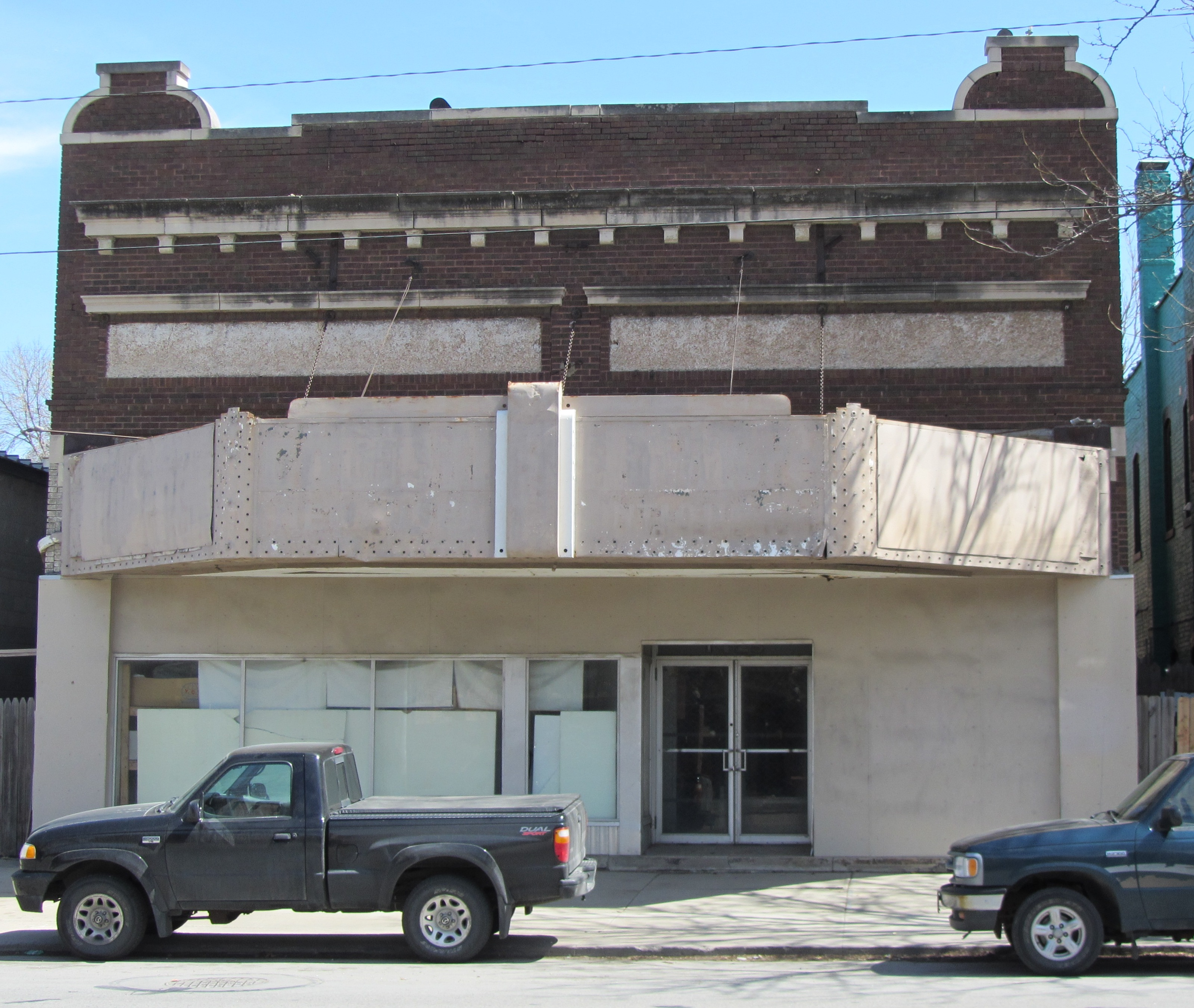
Former Maryland Theatre

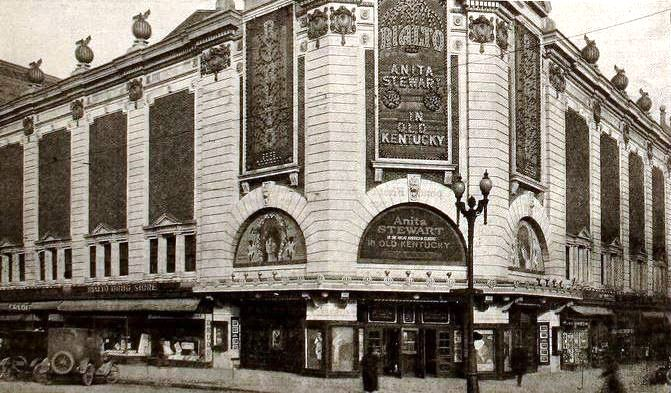
Rialto Theater

Theaters of the past in Omaha
Name Ames Theater	Built	Seating	Location	Notes
Academy of Music	1866		South Side of Douglas, between Thirteenth and Fourteenth Streets	Referred to as Omaha's first playhouse.
Admiral Theater	1942	950	150 South 40th Street	Originally built as a single-screen theater, a second screen was added later. It was known locally for its midnight showings of The Rocky Horror Picture Show. The building has been demolished and the site redeveloped.
Aksarben Coliseum	1928	7,200	64th and Center Streets	The building was the site of numerous concerts and performance events through the Knights of Aksarben organization. The coliseum was torn down in 2005 and the site redeveloped.
Aksarben Music Hall			1309 Douglas	
Air Dome Theater (Open Tent Show)			18th and Douglas Streets, 40th and Hamilton Streets	An open-air theater that operated during the summer months. The primary locations were downtown Omaha and later at 40th and Hamilton Streets.
Alhambra Theatre	Abt. 1911		1814 North 24th Street	After its closure it became a roller rink, a grocery store and a miniature golf course before burning to the ground in 1936.
Alamo Theater		300	303 North 24th Street	
American Music Hall	1910		1722 Douglas Street	It was later called the New Morris Theater and the Strand Theater. The building was destroyed by fire in the 1920s. The first color movie shown in Omaha, The Black Pirate starring Douglas Fairbanks, ran at the Strand.
Apollo Theatre		475	2824 Leavenworth Street	
The Auditorium		5000	Southeast corner of 15th Street	Omaha's original auditorium, not to be confused with the Omaha Civic Auditorium
Avenue Theatre	Abt. 1926	800	2819 Leavenworth Avenue	The theater was closed in 1959. It has since been demolished.
Beacon Theater	1927	477	2910 Ames Avenue	The theatre closed in 1967 and the building demolished.
Benalto Theater	1923	400	6054 Military Avenue	Due to readdressing, the current address is 6054 Maple Street. Originally built as a vaudeville theater, it was called the Benalto Theater from 1923 to 1926. It was later renamed the Benson Theater for the neighborhood it is located within. The theater is currently closed and is in need of a total renovation. A nonprofit organization has been formed to spearhead the fundraising effort.
Besse Theater			24th and N Streets	
Bijou Theatre			19th and Harney Streets	
Boulevard Theater	1916		3305 Leavenworth Street	
Boyd's Opera House	1881		1422 Farnam Street	The first Boyd Theater in Omaha, built by businessman and politician James F. Boyd. It was later renamed as the Farnam Street Theatre. Although labeled as fireproof it was destroyed by fire on October 2, 1893.
Boyd's Theater and Opera House	1891	1900	1621 Harney Street	The building was demolished in 1920 and the property redeveloped for the then owner's department store business.
Brandeis Theatre	March 3, 1910	1900	212 South 17th Street	In 1925, theater-goers wept as Helen Keller and her teacher described their struggle to overcome Keller's blindness, deafness and muteness. The theater had a ceiling mural in the foyer, "The Triumphal Entry of Art" by E. T. Behr, which cost $2,500. The Brandeis Theater was razed in 1959 to make way for a parking garage.
Burt Theater	August 1, 1915		24th and Sprague Streets	
Burwood Theater	1905	1168	1516 Harney Street	This became the Gayety Theatre in 1909. It had a stock company of players, including Fred Astaire. It later became a burlesque theater. In 1931 the building was remodeled to house retail stores and offices. The building was torn down in 1961.
Cameraphone Theatre	1908	450	1403 Douglas Street	A uniquely named theater, its name means "talking picture".
Cass Theater	Mid 1940s	250	500 North 16th Street	The theater closed in the mid-1950s and has since been demolished.
Center Theater	March 15, 1951	732	3504 Center Street	When the theater opened, it offered such innovations as a smoking room, a crying room for children and parents, and a wheel chair area. It was also the first theater in Omaha to have a reverse pitch floor, whereby the floor slopes to the stage to a low-point then rises toward the stage. From 1974 to 1993 the building was home to the Emmy Gifford Children's Theater. The building was expanded and updated during their residency. In 1993 the children's theater company moved to the former Riviera Theater. The building currently houses an estate and consignment sales company.
Chief Theater	1947		4612 South 24th Street	The theatre's marquee was the profile of an American Indian Chief wearing a full headdress.
Cinema Center	December 22, 1967	3,280	2828 South 82nd Avenue	The first movie shown was The Bible. Expanded to two screens in 1969; four in 1976; six in 1981; eight in 1984. Renovated for stadium seating in 1997. Sold to commercial developers in September 2008. Closed on January 15, 2009. The last movie shown was Marley & Me. The building was converted into an indoor shooting range in 2015.
Clifton Theater			2201 Military Avenue	
Circle Theater	April 3, 1926		524 North 33rd Street	The theater closed in the 1950s. The building was later demolished and a parking lot occupies the site today.
Clunes Theatre			2553 Farnam Street	
Columbia Theatre		450	1710 South 10th Street	
Comfort Theatre		330	2319 Vinton Street	Later called the Garden Theatre
Corby Theater	1926	600	2805 North 16th Street	The theater closed in the mid-1950s. The building is currently used as a commercial location.
Crossroads Twin Cinema	July 20, 1979		72nd and Dodge Streets	This theater was inside the Crossroads Mall. It closed in the 1980s and the area repurposed by the mall.
Diamond Moving Picture Theatre		390	2410 Lake Street	The building was demolished in the Easter Sunday tornado of 1913. The Lake Theater later occupied this location.
Eagle Theatre	December 25, 1915	400	3705 Leavenworth Street	For fire safety, the screen was in the front of the theater and the projection equipment was in the rear.
Elite Theatre #1		400	1316 Douglas Street	
Elite Theatre #2		450	1318 Farnam Street	
Empress Theatre		1800	1514 Douglas Street	The theater featured such innovations as an elevator to its two balconies and a two-story basement café/restaurant that later became a popular dance spot, known as the Rustic Gardens. The theater was torn down in 1929 to make way for an office building.
The Moving Picture Farnam Theatre			1415 Farnam Street	
Favorite Theatre		600	1716 Vinton Street	The Favorite was a silent movie theater built by Fritz Mueller. With the advent of talking movies, Mueller built the Mueller Theatre just a few doors to the east of the Favorite. The Favorite eventually closed and was used for various commercial activities over the years. Today it is the main dining area of a restaurant, complete with exposed brick walls and iron columns. The tiled entry vestibule with the name "Favorite" spelled out in cobalt blue tile is still visible.
Fox In Westroads			10245 West Dodge Road	This theater started as a large single screen and was twinned in 1976. It later merged with the Six West Theaters and was renamed Westroads 8. The theater has been demolished and replaced with retail space.
Fern Theater			716 North 24th Street	This was closed on the day of the Easter Sunday tornado, 1913.
Firehouse Dinner Theater	1972	300	11th and Jackson Street	The theater opened in a vacated city firehouse in the Old Market.
Franklin Theatre		300	1624 North 24th Street	
Frolic Theater		360	4116 North 24th Street	
Gem Theatre		550	1258 South 13th Street	
Gemini Twin Theater			2958 South 84th Street	The theater operated as a 99-cent theater. It closed in January 1991.
Grand Theater			2929 North 16th Street	
Grand Ole Players	1984		2339 N 90th Street	Closed in 2010
Grand Opera House	1885	2,486	15th and Davenport Streets	The seating capacity in the adjoining Exposition Hall was 1900. The building burned to the ground on December 4, 1894.
Hanscom Theatre		300	2368 South 29th Street	
Hipp Theatre		700	1508 Harney Street	
Hippodrome Theatre		400	2514 Cuming Street	Later called the Capitol Theater
Hippodrome Theatre		1800	1724 Douglas Street	
John Beasley Theater			3010 R Street	
Ideal Theatre		350	2210 South 16th Street	
Indian Hills Theater	December 1962		8601 West Dodge Street	At its opening in December 1962, its 105-foot screen, the largest in the United States, was designed specifically designed for Cinerama. The theater was expanded from a single screen, to two and finally to four screens. The theater was closed in October 2000. After a large public effort to save it failed, the building was demolished in 2001.
"It" Theatre		300	2910 Sherman Avenue	
Ivy Theatre		200	2128 Sherman Avenue	
Joyo Theater			Florence, Nebraska	
Lothrop Theater	1935	480	3212 North 24th Street	The theater closed in 1955. It was used by the Corinth Baptist Church for a time. The building collapsed in 1961 and was later demolished.
Loyal Theatre		300	2410 Caldwell Street	
Lyric Theatre		400	1617 Vinton Street	
The Magic Theater			4922 South 24th Street	The theater's original name, "The Magic Theater", was a nod to South Omaha's nickname, "The Magic City", for the area's seemingly overnight growth. The theater's name was later changed to the Tivoli Theater. The Tivoli theater ultimately closed in the 1950s.
Majestic Theater			1520 Dodge Street	
Maplewood Twin Cinema	November 9, 1972		3433 North 90th Street	Opened as a Jerry Lewis Cinema. Closed in 1994. The building has been demolished and the site redeveloped.
Maryland Theatre		492	1425 South 13th Street	The theater was renamed the Berkley Theater in the 1940s. It closed in the mid-1950s and currently is used as a commercial location.
Midtown Upstairs Dinner Theater			221 South 19th Street	Later simply called the Upstairs Dinner Theater
Military Theatre	1928	660	2216 Military Avenue	The theater closed in 1975. It is now the home of Grace Apostolic Church.
Millard Cinema 4	March 25, 1983	1,250	Q Street at Highway 50	This theater closed in 1998.
Minne Lusa Theater	Abt. 1926	400	6720 North 30th Street	The building was designed by George Fisher of the firm of Mendelssohn, Fisher and Lawrie. The theater closed in the mid-1950s. The building is used today as a social services center.
Monroe Theater			2555 Farnam Street	
Moon Theater			1408 Douglas Street	This was later called the Town Theater and the Cooper Theater or Cooper 70. It briefly housed the Cinerama technology before it was moved to the Indian Hills Theater. It was razed in 1976.
Movies 8 Stockyards	June 1990		3205 L Street	The theater was closed on February 26, 2010. The plans at the time were to raze it to build a truck parking lot.
Mueller Theater			1706 Vinton Street	The name of the theater was originally the Mueller Theatre. After its remodeling in 1938, its name was changed to the Muller Theatre. The building was totally destroyed by a series of three fires on June 1, July 14 and August 2, 1970. At the time of the fire, the building was being used as a bingo parlor.
Muse Theater	1916	850	2405 Farnam Street	Originally built as a vaudeville theater, it became an adult theater in the 1970s. The theater closed in the 1980s after several police raids to seize pornographic material. It has been demolished.
The Music Box	October 1, 1936	900	118 N. 19th Street	The building also included a bowling alley. It was closed in 1980, and the building was demolished to become a parking lot.
The New Star Theater			16th and Locust Streets	
North Star Theatre	1920	800	2413 Ames Avenue	Later renamed the Ames Theater
Northampton 4 Theaters	1973	900	56th and Redick Streets	The theater was later renamed the Country Club 4 Theaters. It closed in April 1982, and some of the equipment was moved to the Millard 4 Cinema.
Omaha Civic Auditorium	1954	10,960	1804 Capitol Avenue	This facility closed in 2014. It was torn down in 2016. The land is currently vacant.
Omaha Civic Auditorium Music Hall	1954	2,315	1804 Capitol Avenue	Attached to the Omaha Civic Auditorium, it was renovated in 1997, then suffered the same fate as the auditorium: closed in 2014, torn down in 2016.
Orchard 4 Cinema	July 23, 1982	876	13052 Arbor Street	It closed in 2000 and the building was demolished in 2013.
Palace Theater		250	2305 Davenport Street	
Palm Theatre		400	1320 Douglas Street	Later called the Magic Theatre
Park Theatre		500	516 North 16th Street	
Park 4 Theater			8558 Park Drive, Ralston	Closed in 1998
Parlor Theatre		450	1408 Douglas Street	Purportedly the first theater built in Omaha for moving pictures. The Parlor Theatre was demolished to build the Moon Theatre.
Pastime Theater		327	23rd and Leavenworth Streets	
Princess Theatre		500	1319 Farnam Street	
Q Cinema 4	1972		5505 South 120th Street	This was later named the Q Cinema 6 in 1982 and finally the Q Cinema 9 in 1989. The theater closed in 2008 and the building was eventually demolished.
Queen Theater			Seventh and Pierce Streets	
Redick Opera House	1870		Northwest corner of 16th and Farnam Streets	It was demolished in 1889, and commercial buildings built on the site.
Rex Theatre			1316 Douglas Street	
Rialto Theater	1918	2,500	1424 Douglas Street	The theater closed on August 2, 1929, and was used for various commercial activities until it was razed in February 1986. Today it is the site of the Union Pacific Headquarters.
Ritz Theater	Mid 1930s	548	2041 North 24th Street	This theater closed in the mid-1950s and has since been demolished.
Rohlff Theater			2559 Leavenworth Street	
Roseland Theatre	1922		4932 South 24th Street	The theater, designed by James T. Allen, closed in 1950 and the building converted to commercial property and eventually rental apartments.
Rudyard Norton Theater			5021 Underwood Avenue	The original location for this theater was the Windsor Hotel, 520 South 10th Street. It later moved to 5021 Underwood Avenue in Dundee.
Six West Theaters	January 22, 1969	1,527	9720 West Dodge Road	This theater was the first six screen theater opened in the United States. It later merged with the Fox In Westroads Theater and was renamed the Westroads 8. Located in the Westroads Mall, the theater closed in 1999 and was converted to retail space.
Star Theatre			2906 Sherman Avenue	
Suburban Theatre		350	4414 North 24th Street	
Sun Theater	Thanksgiving Day, November 30, 1916	800	1410 Farnam Street	The theater was later called the State Theater. The lights in the red and ivory lobby were shaped like sunbursts. The theater closed in 1969 and the building was demolished in 1976.
Swedish Auditorium		1200	1609-1611 Chicago Street	
Trocadero Theater	1895	1800	319 South 14th Street	The Trocadero Theater was renamed the Krug Theatre in 1903.
Uptown Theatre	Abt. 1926	600	2816 Leavenworth Street	This was renamed the Arbor Theatre around 1936. The theatre closed sometime around 1950, and has since been demolished.
Venezia Theatre		220	1211 South 13th Street	
Victoria Theatre			5303 North 24th Stt	Later renamed the Fort Theatre
Westroads Dinner Theater	September 1, 1970	500	10000 California Street, Basement	A circular stage was surrounded by tables for patrons. Located in the basement of the Westroads Mall, the theater closed on February 22, 1978.
Winn Theatre			4006 1/2 Hamilton Street	Later called the Fortieth Street Theatre
Wonderland Theater			1315 and 1317 Farnam Street	Theater, Curio Hall and Palace of Illusions
Wonderland Theatre			2525 South 13th Street	
World Theater	1922	2,100	1506 Douglas Street	In February 1935 the theater's name was changed to the Omaha Theater. The theater ceased operations on February 26, 1978. When plans for its restoration failed, the theater was razed in 1980 and a parking garage erected on the site.

== Drive-in theaters ==
Drive-in theaters in Omaha
Name	Built	Capacity	Location	Notes
76 West Dodge Drive-In Theatre	1948	648 cars	Dodge corner of 76th Street	It was closed on July 17, 1983, and was demolished. A strip mall now stands on the site. At the time it closed, it was noted as being Omaha's oldest drive-in theater.
84th and Center Drive-In Theatre	1953		84th and Center Streets	This theater closed in 1974.
Airport Drive-In	1954		11th and Locust Streets, Carter Lake	Later called the Capri Drive-In; closed in 1972
Golden Spike	1952	650 cars	11400 Dodge Street	The first feature shown at this theater was Show Boat, starring Kathryn Grayson, Ava Gardner and Howard Keel. This theater closed in 1985, was demolished, and a shopping center was built in its place.
Q-Twin Drive-In	1961	1600 cars	5580 South 120th Street	Had a dual screen, and a sports car section. Its closure, in 1987, marked the end of drive-in theaters in Omaha. In 1988 the land was redeveloped for upscale homes.
Sky-View Drive-In	August 1954	1100 cars	7200 Hartman Avenue	The drive-in was typically open March through December. The drive-in closed in 1985 and the land redeveloped for a storage facility.

== See also ==
- History of Omaha
- Theatre in Omaha, Nebraska
