= Rose Blumkin Performing Arts Center =

Historic performing arts center in Omaha, Nebraska, U.S.

- U.S. National Register of Historic Places
- Omaha Landmark
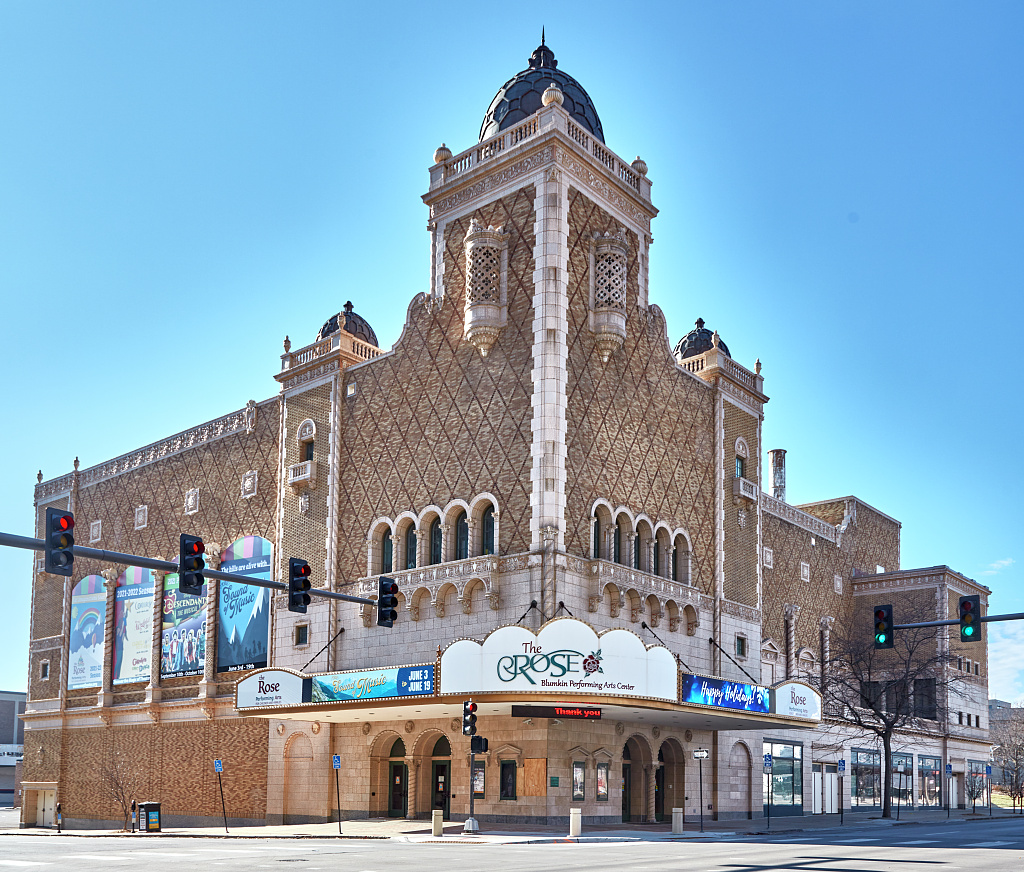
- Rose Blumkin Performing Arts Center in 2021

- Location within Nebraska Location within the United States
- Location: 2001 Farnam St., Omaha, Nebraska 68102
- Coordinates: 41°15′25.89″N 95°56′32.78″W
- Built: 1926
- Architect: John Eberson
- Architectural style: Classical Revival, Exotic Revival
- NRHP reference No.: 74001108

Significant dates
- Added to NRHP: August 13, 1974
- Designated OMAL: October 21, 1980

The Rose Blumkin Performing Arts Center or The Rose, originally opened as The Riviera. It is located in Downtown Omaha, Nebraska, United States. Built in 1926 in a combination of both Moorish and Classical styles, the building was rehabilitated in 1986.

== History ==
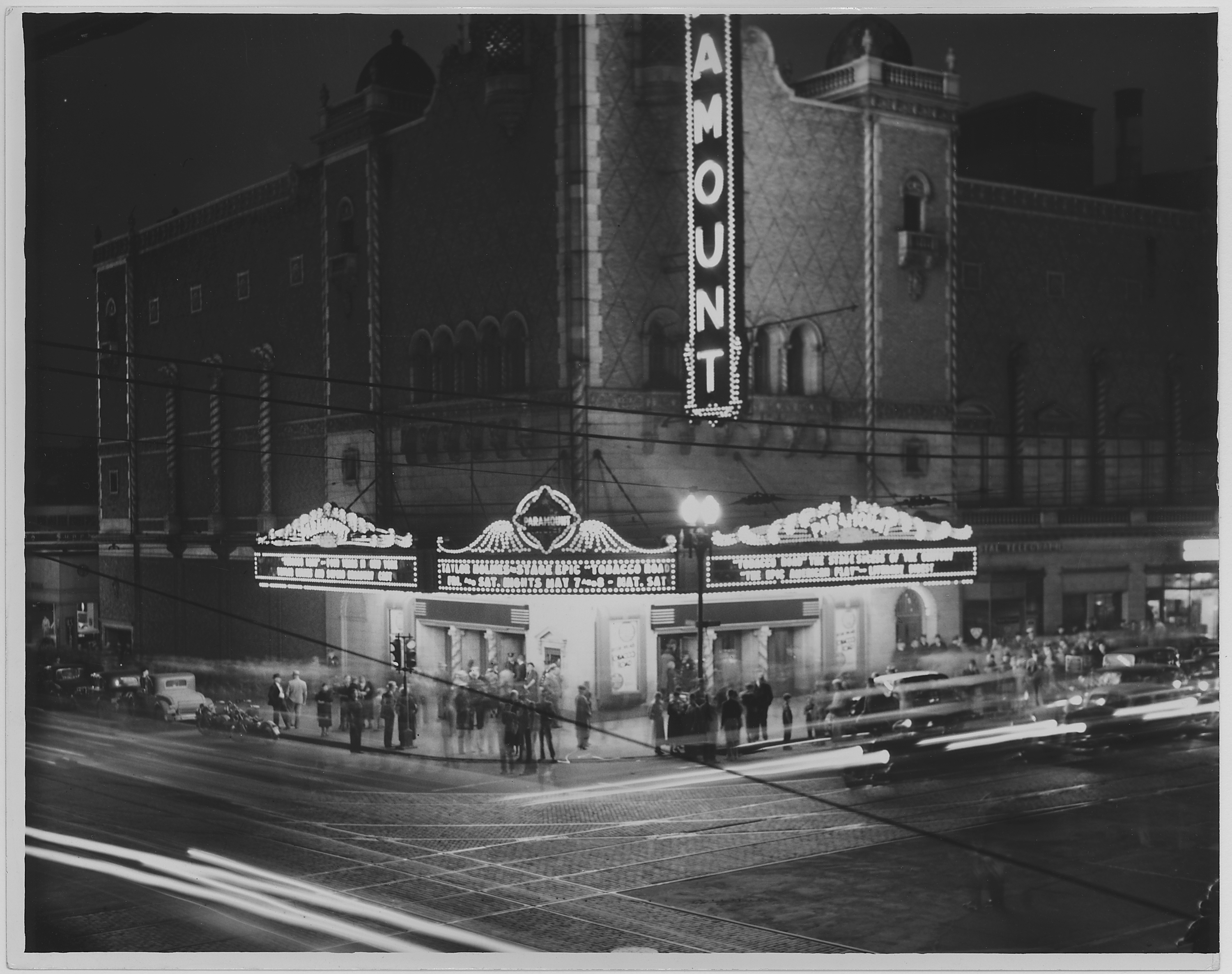
Paramount Theater. Omaha, 1937

John Eberson, a nationally notable architect, designed the theater in 1926 as an example of the "atmospheric" theater popular during the 1920s. In a style created by Eberson, these atmospheric theaters simulated romantic outdoor Mediterranean courtyards with a night sky above, including twinkling stars and drifting clouds.

The exterior of the building features a large copper domed tower, flanked by two smaller towers of similar detailing. The diamond-patterned brick facades contain oriel windows, elaborate cornices, glazed terra-cotta tile copings, and a series of free-standing columns which support griffins. The theater was built by A. H. Blank.

Noted for lavish stage shows combined with movies, the theater was regarded as one of the most elegant entertainment facilities in the Midwest and had 2,776 seats. After opening March 26, 1927, someone commented that the Riviera Theatre "makes every man feel like a millionaire for 60 cents". A parade featuring the 17th Infantry Regiment was held to celebrate its opening.

In 1929, unable to meet the $13,000 weekly costs and experiencing financial losses, Blank sold it to Paramount Pictures and the theater was renamed the Paramount. It had multiple closures including in 1934, 1937, 1938, 1940, 1941 and 1942. Paramount installed a minitiature golf course in the lower lobby to attract customers. In June 1952 it stopped showing films but the theater productions during the winter were not that successful and it closed again. In August 1953 its owner, Tristates, decided to sell or demolish it.

In 1957, Paramount vacated the lease to Creighton University. Closed for several years, it was later leased to J.S.B. Amusement, and after renovations, was operated as a bowling alley. After only a year of operation, the building once again was remodeled to return it to a theater.

It reopened as a movie theater in 1962 with a new name, the Astro Theatre, run by Dubinsky Brothers and with a reduced capacity of 1,465. It continued operations until June 1980. In 1974 it was added to the National Register of Historic Places and in October 1980 it was listed as an Omaha landmark. Closed and once again facing possible demolition, the Astro Theatre was sold by Creighton University to Rose Blumkin of the Nebraska Furniture Mart on June 24, 1981. In the early 1990s it was renovated and transformed into the Rose Blumkin Performing Arts Center; it became the home of the Omaha Theater Company, which began performing there in 1995.

== See also ==
- History of Omaha
- List of theaters in Omaha, Nebraska
- Creighton Orpheum Theater
- Moon Theater
- Rialto Theater
- World Theater
