= World Theater (Omaha, Nebraska) =

- Omaha Theater
- Interactive map of World Theater
- Address: 1506 Douglas Street; Omaha, Nebraska; United States
- Coordinates: 41.2590°N 95.9362°W
- Owner: World Realty Co.
- Capacity: 2,100
- Type: Vaudeville, Movie theater
- Current use: Razed 1980

Construction
- Opened: April 15, 1922
- Closed: February 26, 1978
- Years active: 1922–1978
- Architects: C. Howard Crane, Fisher & Lawrie

The World Theater was a vaudeville and movie theater at 1506 Douglas Street in downtown Omaha, Nebraska. Its name was changed to the Omaha Theater in February 1935 when it was sold to new management. It closed on February 26, 1978, and was razed in 1980 to allow for the construction of a parking garage.

== History ==
The 2,500 seat World Theater was designed by architect C. Howard Crane for the World Realty Company. Crane, a native of Detroit, was one of the foremost theatrical architects in the United States. Harry Lawrie, of the Omaha architectural firm of Fisher & Lawrie, oversaw the project from Omaha. The James Black Masonry and Construction Company served as the general contractors. Construction took ten months.

The theater was constructed of brick on a steel frame. The exterior was faced in glazed terra cotta all around. Three grand arched windows with iron mullions separated by four sets of Corinthian columns dominated the front of the theater. Railings with balustrade sills completed the windows' ornamentation. The Corinthian columns supported an enriched frieze and cornice decorated with dentils and modillions. A parapet band with sculptured inserts and the inscribed words, World Theatre, was centered at the top of the building.

The interior included a large chandelier with a thousand cut-glass crystals hanging from the large center dome of gold and silver inlay. Two smaller chandeliers hung from two lesser domes. In the lobby hung a chandelier of prismatic glass in the shape of a globe, surrounded by an orbit of comets, stars and crescents. Torchers of cathedral glass set on Corinthian shafts and marble bases are on the mezzanine foyer, and a ceiling of Chinese silk and Chinese coins decorated the women's lounge. The stage curtain was made of velvet with gold fringe and large tassels sewn by the Drapery Department of the J. L. Brandeis and Sons Store. The velvet carpets, also provided by the J. L. Brandeis Store, were in harmonizing shades of blue and gold. Completing the Brandeis decorations were davenports and overstuffed chairs in the promenade lounge and other smaller lounges.

A $45,000 pipe organ manufactured by Hope-Jones Wurlitzer was installed by the theater's opening. The grand opening of the World Theater was on Saturday, April 15, 1922. A crowd of over 10,000 attended the opening with shows at 2:00 pm, 4:20 pm, 6:45 pm and 9:15 pm. Prices for the grand opening were 50 cents for unreserved seats, and 75 cents with a reservation.

In February 1935 the World Theater was sold and the new management renamed it the Omaha Theater. It closed on February 26, 1978. When plans for redevelopment of the theater failed, the building was razed in 1980 and a parking garage built at the location.

== See also ==
- History of Omaha
- List of theaters in Omaha, Nebraska
- Astro Theater
- Creighton Orpheum Theater
- Moon Theater
- Rialto Theater
