= Dundee Theater =

Movie theater in Nebraska, United States

Coordinates: 41°15′36″N 95°59′23″W

Film Streams' Dundee Theater
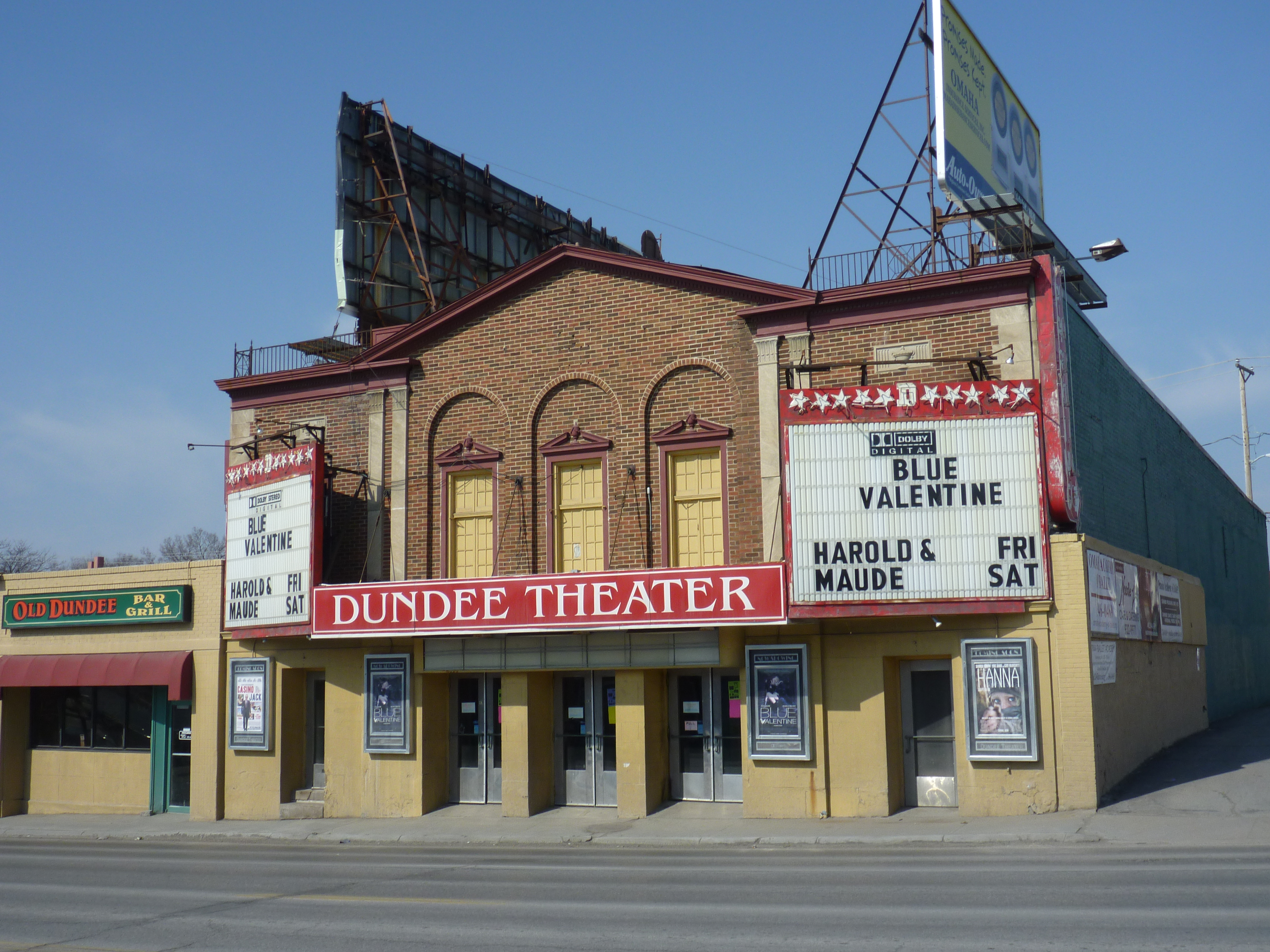
- Interactive map of Film Streams' Dundee Theater
- Address: 4952 Dodge Street; Omaha, Nebraska; United States
- Owner: Film Streams
- Capacity: 300
- Type: Independent art house
- Current use: Movie Theater

Construction
- Opened: 1925
- Years active: 1925-present

Website
- http://www.filmstreams.org/

The Dundee Theater is an historic movie theater located at 4952 Dodge Street in Omaha, Nebraska. Now operated by the nonprofit Film Streams, the Dundee is the longest-surviving neighborhood cinema in Omaha.

== History ==
The Dundee Theater opened to the public on December 19, 1925. Described by the Omaha World-Herald as "Omaha's newest photoplay house," the Dundee opened with the silent comedy The Trouble with Wives and the short film The Fighting Dude, written and directed by Fatty Arbuckle. Four years later, in 1929, management at the Dundee installed sound equipment and the cinema entered a new era of film exhibition. In 1938, the Dundee Theater underwent a major renovation, including the installation of new projection and sound equipment, new seats, and a new marquee.

In 1958, the owners of the Indian Hills Theater, the Cooper Foundation, purchased the Dundee from the Goldberg Circuit. In 1963, it rebranded as an art house, reopening with Federico Fellini's 8 1/2. In 1965, the theater underwent another significant renovation prior to its historic run of The Sound of Music, which lasted 118 weeks. At the time, it was second only to a theater in London for the longest first run of a film.

After a few more long runs of popular features, the theater returned to programming art and foreign films. In 1974, the Cooper Foundation sold the Dundee to Edward Cohen and David Frank of Omaha. They changed the theater's offering to family pictures in an attempt to create a "top-notch house". The theater closed for a short time and in 1980 was purchased and renovated by Denny Moran of Moran Cinemas. Moran operated the theater for more than three decades, typically playing art films and the occasional wider release. It also became a fixture for its midnight movie series of classic and cult films. Popular titles featured as part of the Midnights at Dundee series have included The Big Lebowski, Donnie Darko, Pulp Fiction, Princess Bride, El Topo, The Rocky Horror Picture Show, Rushmore, Who Framed Roger Rabbit, Willy Wonka & the Chocolate Factory, Foxy Brown and The Room.

In 2013, the Dundee Theater closed for planned renovations. A few years later, it was sold to Sherwood Foundation, with plans to turn over operations to the nonprofit Film Streams. In 2016, Film Streams launched a capital campaign to support its renovation and expansion of the Dundee Theater, which would become the organization's second location. Renovations began in February 2017. Improvements and additions included a new entrance on the north side of the cinema, updated ticketing and concessions counters, a new bookstore ("Katie's Video") offering film periodicals, Blu-rays and DVDs, an expanded lobby shared with restaurant partner Kitchen Table Central, and a new 25-seat screening room, the Linder Microcinema. New seats, screen, projection and sound equipment were installed in the historic auditorium. Named in honor of Peggy Payne, mother of Oscar-winning filmmaker, Omaha native and former Film Streams Board Member Alexander Payne, the main theater seats 300.

== Present day ==
Film Streams completed its renovation of the Dundee Theater in November 2017, and reopened December 1, 2017.
