= Richard L. Crowther =

American architect known for solar-energy and futurist design

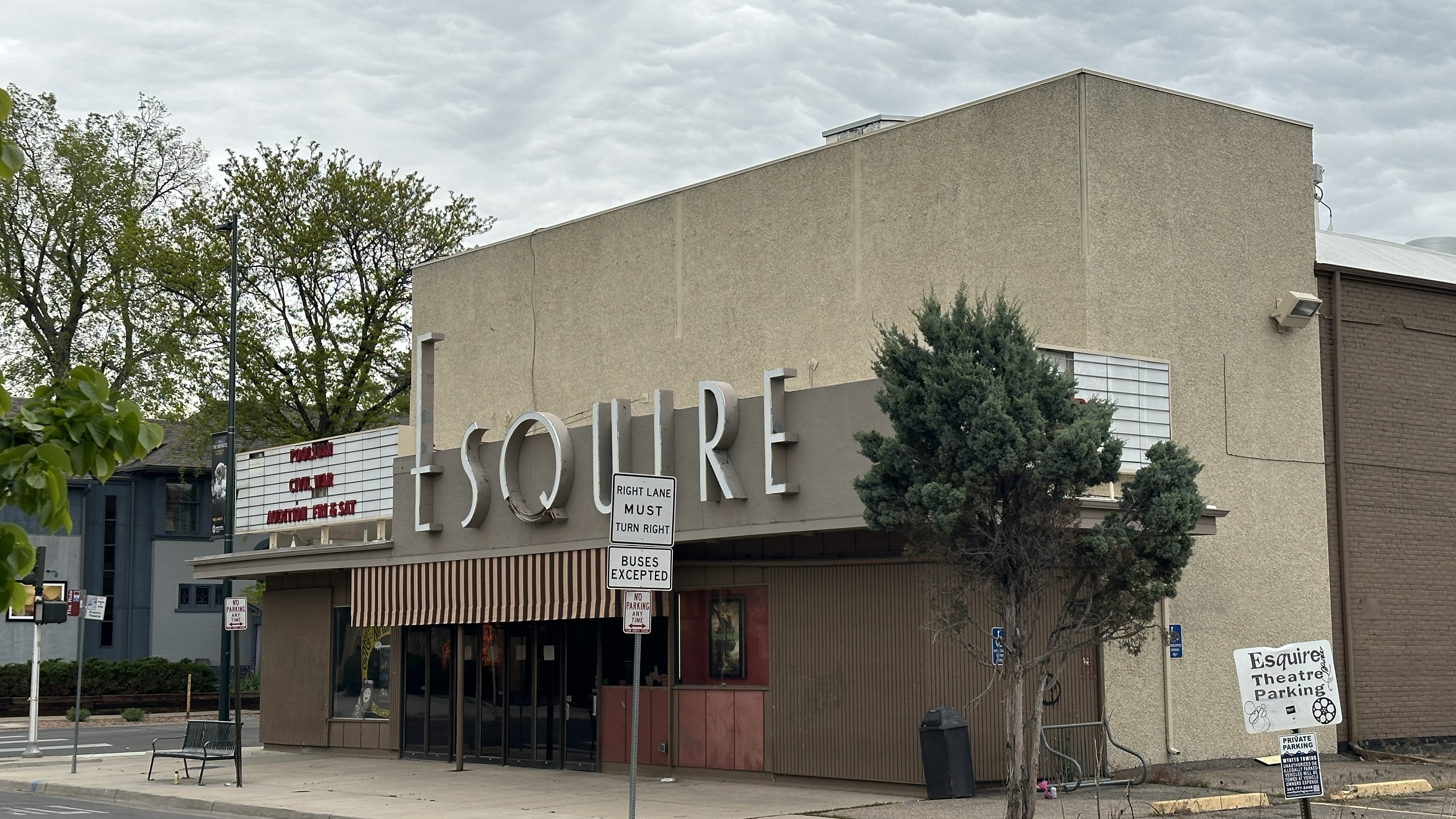
The Esquire Theatre in May 2024, showing the modernist exterior Crowther designed in 1965. The building is one of Crowther's few surviving Denver works.

Richard Layton Crowther, FAIA, (December 16, 1910 – December 25, 2006) was an architect and author who achieved international renown for his progressive holistic compositions, particularly his pioneering designs employing passive solar energy.

== Career ==
Crowther was born in Newark, New Jersey, and moved to San Diego, California at age 21. He worked for a neon sign manufacturer and later employed neon light as an architectural element and as ambient illumination. In 1948, Crowther moved to Denver, Colorado, where he built ticket booths and renovated the ballroom at Lakeside Amusement Park. He also began building energy-efficient homes in Denver.

Crowther designed the spacious, sleek-lined Cooper Cinerama Theater in Glendale, Colorado, near Denver; another Cooper theater in St. Louis Park, Minnesota; and the Indian Hills Theater in Omaha, Nebraska. All were the first theaters designed around the Cinerama film technology, with cushioned seats on curving risers. The original blueprints for the theater are in the Denver Public Library Western History and Genealogy Department.

The first such theater, the Cooper Theater, in Glendale, near Denver, featured a 146-degree louvered screen (measuring a massive 105 feet by 35 feet), 814 seats, courtesy lounges on the sides of the theatre for relaxation during intermission (including smoking facilities), and a ceiling which routed air and heating through small vent slots in order to inhibit noise from the building's ventilation equipment. The other two theatres were built in a similar format, however, the last theatre, the Indian Hills Theater had a slightly larger screen and other improvements.

Each element of the theaters was designed to enhance the Cinerama experience. The circular design took advantage of the discovery that patrons, if left to their own devices, would seat themselves in an oval pattern. The exterior circular shape served as a constant reminder to passing motorists that this was a Cinerama theater. The design included a cylindrical shape and a flat roof.

The base of the building exteriors consisted of black Roman brick. The upper portion of the exteriors were clad in insulated Monopanels which were a burnt-orange color called "Swedish red."

His pioneering work in residential solar technology led to lectures at the Smithsonian Institution, solar conferences and universities across the U.S. Crowther's architecture publications are still used to teach students. His "Sun-Earth" text has a reputation for setting a benchmark in holistic architecture design, with arguments outlining economic and environmental benefits. He practiced what he preached, both by living and working in holistically designed spaces, and by a diet replete with organic and natural foods.

In 2006, Crowther was interviewed by filmmaker Jim Fields, for his documentary movie Preserve Me A Seat, about the grass-root failures and successes of activists working to preserve historic movie theaters in Boston, Chicago, Omaha and Salt Lake City.

In 1965, Crowther redesigned the exterior of the Esquire Theatre (originally the Hiawatha Theater, 1927) at 590 Downing Street in Denver's Capitol Hill neighborhood, replacing its original ornamental facade with an austere modernist exterior. The Denver Landmark Preservation Commission later noted that "the Esquire Theater exhibits many of Crowther's design principals including the use of materials and signage design." Unlike the demolished Cooper theaters, the Esquire building survives; it operated as a cinema until 2024 and is slated for adaptive reuse with its Crowther-designed marquee signs preserved.

The Cooper theaters and many of Crowther's other designs have been demolished. He particularly regretted seeing one of his energy-efficient homes expanded into a larger but inefficient showcase.

Crowther was a Fellow of the American Institute of Architects. Crowther's late modern style home at 401 North Madison Street in Denver, which he designed and had built in 1979, was, in 2022, considered for historic preservation. However, the Denver City Council rejected preservationists' appeals to save the house, which was later demolished and replaced with two luxury duplexes.

== Selected works ==
- Ecological architecture (Butterworth–Heinemann, 1992) ISBN 0-7506-9171-9
- Sun, earth: Alternative energy design for architecture (Simon and Schuster, 1983) ISBN 0-442-21498-7
- Affordable passive solar homes: Low-cost, compact designs (American Solar Energy Society, 1984) ISBN 0-916653-00-5
