= Cooper Cinerama Theater =

Former Cinerama theater in Glendale, Colorado

- Interactive map of Cooper Cinerama Theater
- Former names: Cooper Theater; Cooper & Cameo; United Artists Theatre
- Address: 960 South Colorado Boulevard; Glendale, Colorado; United States
- Coordinates: 39.6988°N 104.9391°W
- Operator: Cooper Foundation (original)
- Capacity: 814 (original auditorium); 1,114 (after 1975 addition)
- Type: Cinema
- Screens: 1 (1961); 2 (after 1975 addition)

Construction
- Opened: March 9, 1961
- Closed: January 7, 1994
- Demolished: 1994
- Years active: 1961–1994
- Cost: $1 million (equivalent to $10,773,942 in 2025)
- Architect: Richard L. Crowther

The Cooper Cinerama Theater, also known as the Cooper Theater or Cooper Theatre, was a Cinerama movie theater at 960 South Colorado Boulevard in Glendale, Colorado, in the Denver metropolitan area. Designed by Denver architect Richard L. Crowther for the Cooper Foundation, it opened on March 9, 1961, with This Is Cinerama. The theater was one of three related Cooper Foundation Cinerama venues, along with the Cooper Theater in St. Louis Park, Minnesota, and the Indian Hills Theater in Omaha, Nebraska.

The Denver-area Cooper was built around the technical requirements of three-strip Cinerama rather than adapted from an existing auditorium. Historic Modern Denver describes it as the first operating theater designed specifically for the Cinerama process. The building's cylindrical auditorium, 146-degree louvered screen, curving risers, projection booths, quiet mechanical systems, and illuminated exterior made it one of Crowther's best-known commercial works. It was converted for multiplex-era operation in the 1970s, later operated by United Artists, closed in January 1994, and was demolished the same year for a Barnes & Noble store.

== Background ==
Cinerama was a widescreen process that used three synchronized 35 mm projectors to cast a panoramic image on a deeply curved, 146-degree screen, accompanied by multi-channel magnetic sound. The process was introduced as a special theatrical attraction in the early 1950s and was commonly presented as a reserved-seat roadshow event rather than as an ordinary neighborhood movie program.

The theater was built by the Cooper Foundation of Lincoln, Nebraska, a charitable foundation rooted in the theater business of Joseph H. Cooper. The foundation's own history says Cooper transferred most of his theater interests to the foundation in 1943 and that, after his death in 1946, the foundation operated a multistate theater chain until selling the business on October 15, 1979. The foundation's Cinerama theaters in Denver, St. Louis Park, and Omaha were later described collectively as a "Golden Triangle" of purpose-built Cinerama houses.

== Architecture ==
Crowther's design began with the Cinerama screen and the audience relationship to it. The Denver Landmark Preservation Commission later summarized the Cooper as a cylindrical theater with a 146-degree louvered screen, 814 seats on curving risers, and a ceiling that routed air and heating through small vents to reduce ventilation noise. Historic Modern Denver gives the building's diameter as 120 feet and the screen dimensions as 105 feet wide by 38 feet high overall, with about 91 by 35 feet visible.

The screen consisted of approximately 2,300 vertical strips of perforated screen material angled like venetian blinds, a construction intended to limit cross-reflection and hot spots on the curved surface. Seating was arranged on curved risers facing the screen, including 150 balcony seats, and the side areas included courtesy lounges for intermission use. Crowther's ventilation strategy was part of the theater's exhibition design: air was diffused through ceiling slots and returned under the seating area so that mechanical noise would not interfere with the Cinerama sound presentation.

The windowless exterior was a prominent example of Crowther's commercial modernism. Historic Modern Denver describes it as clad in insulated metal mono-panels painted "Bittersweet Orange", set above a base of black Roman brick and illuminated from both the ground and roof. The theater opened at a reported cost of $1 million (equivalent to $10,773,942 in 2025).

Crowther had worked as a neon light designer before moving to Denver in 1948, and later became known for passive-solar and holistic architecture. The Cooper was not a solar building, but it reflected his interest in shaping architecture around perception, environmental control, lighting, and commercial display. Crowther also designed the related Cooper theaters in St. Louis Park and Omaha, and later remodeled Denver's Esquire Theatre.

== Operation ==
The Cooper opened on March 9, 1961, with This Is Cinerama. Historic Modern Denver describes the opening as a black-tie event attended by broadcaster Lowell Thomas, Colorado governor Stephen McNichols, Cinerama president Nicolas Reisini, and Cinerama vice president B. G. Kranze. The theater operated on the roadshow model, with reserved seats, limited performances, intermissions, souvenir programs, and formal presentation practices that distinguished Cinerama from ordinary film exhibition.

The Cooper's most important three-strip narrative engagement was How the West Was Won, which opened at the theater on March 7, 1963. Historic Modern Denver, In70mm.com, and incinerama.com list the Denver run at 85 weeks.

By the mid-1960s, Cinerama exhibition was moving away from the original three-strip process toward single-strip 70 mm films marketed under the Cinerama name. The Cooper showed It's a Mad, Mad, Mad, Mad World beginning in October 1964 and 2001: A Space Odyssey beginning on April 10, 1968; In70mm.com lists the Denver run of 2001 at 42 weeks.

Selected roadshow and large-format engagements
Film	Denver Cooper opening	Notes
This Is Cinerama	March 9, 1961	Opening attraction
How the West Was Won	March 7, 1963	Three-strip Cinerama engagement; listed by several theater-history sources as an 85-week Denver run
It's a Mad, Mad, Mad, Mad World	October 1964	Single-strip 70 mm Cinerama-era presentation
2001: A Space Odyssey	April 10, 1968	Listed by In70mm.com as a 42-week Denver engagement

== Later history and demolition ==
The roadshow business model that supported the Cooper weakened in the 1970s as film distribution shifted toward wider release patterns and multiplex operation. In 1975, a smaller second auditorium, the 300-seat Cooper Cameo, was added to the original building. Historic Modern Denver describes the later venue names as Cooper Twin, Cooper 1-2-3, and Cooper & Cameo.

The theater later passed through corporate operation. Cinema Treasures says that United Artists operated the theater beginning on December 26, 1988, and that after years of changing hands it closed on January 7, 1994. The building was sold to Barnes & Noble and demolished in 1994. Because it was only 33 years old when demolished, the Cooper had not yet reached the 50-year age convention commonly associated with National Register evaluation, although federal guidance allows younger properties to qualify if they are exceptionally important.

== Legacy ==
The Cooper was the first of the Cooper Foundation's three purpose-built Cinerama theaters. The St. Louis Park Cooper closed in 1991 and was demolished in 1992, while Omaha's Indian Hills Theater closed in 2000 and was demolished in 2001 after a preservation campaign that drew national attention. Together, the three theaters are remembered as specialized buildings that translated Cinerama's projection system into architecture.

For Crowther, the Cooper linked commercial display, cinema technology, and environmental control. Denver Public Library identifies the Cooper Cinerama theaters among his major commercial works, while the Denver Landmark Preservation Commission has cited the demolished Denver Cooper in discussing the relative scarcity of surviving Crowther work in Denver.

== See also ==
- Cinerama Dome
- Seattle Cinerama
- Indian Hills Theater
- Esquire Theatre (Denver)
