= Jim Fields =

American film director

- Born: James Wallace Fields; September 1958 (age 67); Omaha, Nebraska, U.S.
- Occupations: Director, Producer, Playwright, Actor, Writer
- Height: 5 ft 10 in (178 cm)

James Wallace Fields (born September 1958) is an American film director, producer, writer, playwright and actor. Fields wrote, produced and directed the movies 416, Saving The Indian Hills, Preserve Me A Seat, Plain Living and Bugeaters. Prior to his film work, Fields wrote and directed the musical comedy Little Red and the play Scarlett Fever.

Fields is a nationally known independent filmmaker who has championed issues of concern to the Midwest and of film lovers in general. He is the owner of the independent film production company Apartment 101 Films. He has also written short stories which have appeared in The Nebraska Review and The Flat Water Rises, an anthology of emerging Nebraska writers.

== Early life ==
James Wallace Fields was born in Omaha, Nebraska, in September 1958. Fields was educated in the Omaha public schools. Starting in his childhood, Fields took an intense interest in film. An early photograph that appears in Saving The Indian Hills depicts Fields at age 16, standing in front of the Indian Hills Theater, which housed the largest indoor movie screen ever constructed. Designed by the architect Richard L. Crowther, the Cinerama theater was considered his greatest achievement. Its unique curved screen provided a 3-D effect that caused moviegoers to feel themselves immersed in the film—especially wide screen movies such as Lawrence of Arabia, Dr. Zhivago and Star Wars.

== Early career ==
After graduating from the University of Nebraska–Lincoln, Fields wrote the play Little Red about the 'Bugeaters', a 1915 University of Nebraska football team that went on to become the Cornhuskers. Fields himself produced and directed Little Red in Omaha. The success of his first play led Fields to write, produce and direct Scarlett Fever, a dramatic play about a 76-year-old woman who wakes up one day and believes she is Scarlett O'Hara from Gone with the Wind. The success of Scarlett Fever led Fields to acquire his first digital video equipment which he used to produce and direct his first feature film: Plain Living.

== Saving The Indian Hills ==
In 2001 Fields found himself swept up in a brewing controversy in Omaha. The aforementioned Indian Hills Theater was sold to Methodist Health Systems, which announced its intention to demolish the theater for a parking lot. A group of Omaha activists formed to save the Indian Hills Theater and Fields was on hand, filming. The preservation fight became a cause célébre, resulting in letters from Hollywood legends pleading for the theater. Such legends included Kirk Douglas, Leonard Maltin, Charlton Heston, Janet Leigh, Ray Bradbury and Patricia Neal. Despite these pleas and a recommendation for the theater as a city landmark by the City of Omaha's Landmarks Preservation Commission, Methodist Health Systems began demolition of the theater shortly after the theater had been declared a landmark.

== 416 ==
The movie 416 is named after Initiative 416, Nebraska's referendum banning same-sex marriage. Fields takes a balanced approach to the issue as he plays the initiative's backers against Nebraskans who oppose the measure, which passed with support from 71% of Nebraska voters. 416 purported to give an objective view of the issue but most reviewers suggested the film was highly critical of the religious right.

== Preserve Me A Seat ==
Although activists did not succeed in saving Omaha’s Indian Hills Theater, Fields captured their tumultuous efforts on film and this resulted in two films: Saving The Indian Hills and footage that later became the core of Preserve Me A Seat. The later film enlarges the focus of Saving The Indian Hills to include other theaters throughout the United States. It presents the story of the Indian Hills Theater Preservation Society, the Omaha group that formed to save the theater, in context with the companion stories of similar groups that formed in other cities with the intention of saving their own theater palaces from the wrecking ball. Because of the controversy surrounding certain elements of the Indian Hills Theater situation, the film's premiere faced long delays while litigation was being resolved. The world premiere occurred in Grand Island, NE. A lively panel discussion followed the feature, which included the film-makers and theater developer, Paul Warshauer. The difficulty and often lack of success of the preservation efforts is a common thread throughout Preserve Me A Seat. This film has seen wide distribution at film festivals across the country.

== Bugeaters ==
Fields' latest work is a documentary film about the 1890 Nebraska football team, entitled Bugeaters.

== Work as a producer ==
As is common with independent producer/directors, Fields has produced all of his works.

== Themes ==
Much of Fields' oeuvre presents the struggle of the common man against entrenched power. His movies portray ordinary people engaged in extraordinary battles in which their lack of power does not equate with a lack of passion.

== Awards ==
Fields' film 416 was chosen as Best Feature in the Central Nebraska Film Festival.
