= Film Streams =

Cinema organization in Omaha, Nebraska, United States

Film Streams' Ruth Sokolof Theater
- Ruth Sokolof Theater

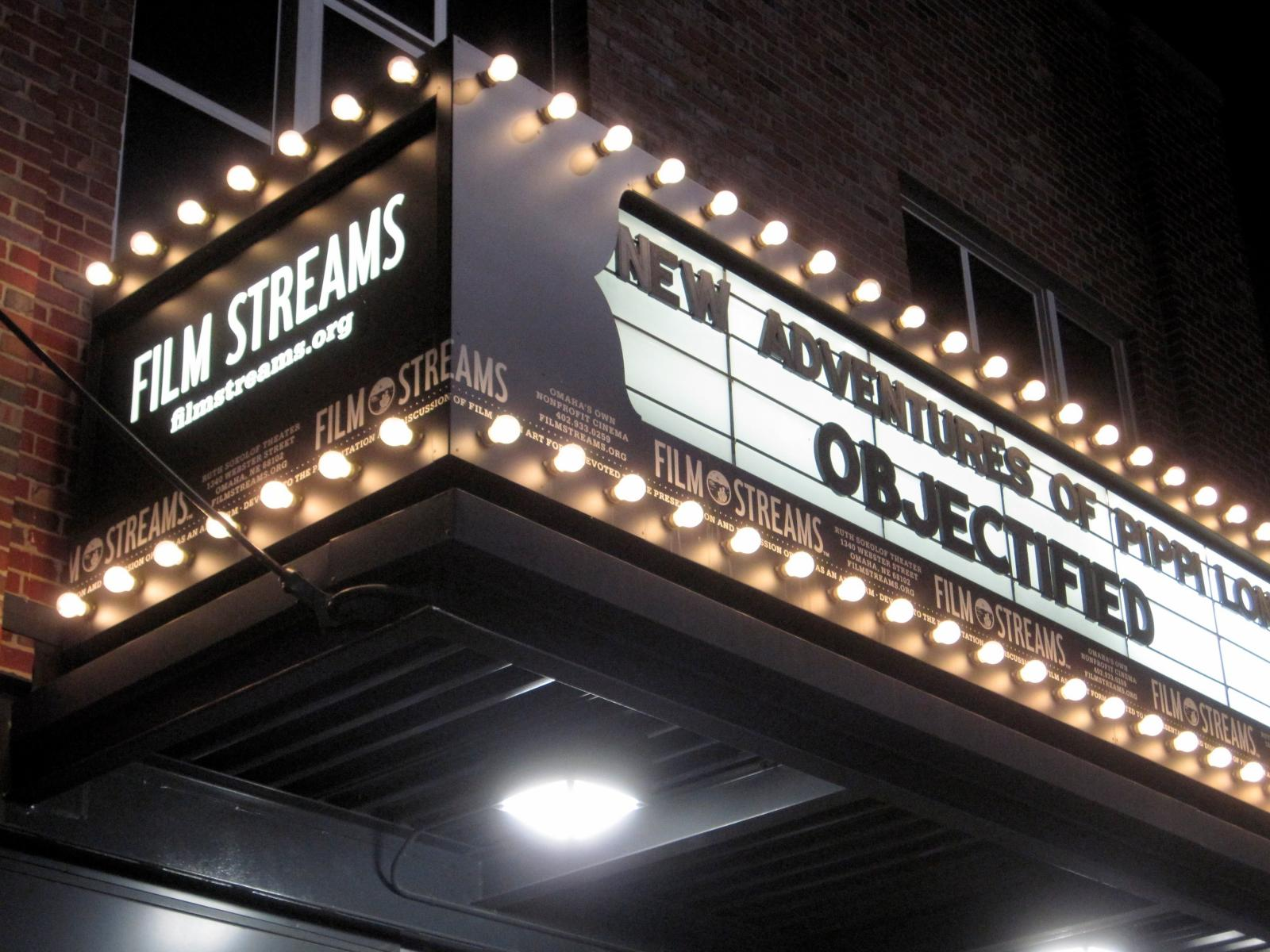
- Interactive map of Film Streams' Ruth Sokolof Theater
- Address: 1340 Mike Fahey Street; Omaha, Nebraska; United States
- Coordinates: 41.26617°N 95.93428°W
- Operator: Film Streams
- Capacity: 206, 96
- Type: Art house

Construction
- Opened: July 27, 2007
- Years active: 2007 to present
- Architect: Alley Poyner Macchietto Architecture

Website
- www.filmstreams.org

Film Streams is a nonprofit arts organization in Omaha, Nebraska which oversees two cinemas: the Ruth Sokolof Theater, in North Downtown Omaha, and the historic Dundee Theater, Omaha's longest surviving neighborhood cinema. It receives funding from corporate and individual donors, members, and the government.

== History ==
Film Streams was founded by Rachel Jacobson in 2005, it states its mission as "enhanc[ing] the cultural environment of the Omaha-Council Bluffs area through the presentation and discussion of film as an art form".

In July 2007, Film Streams opened the Ruth Sokolof Theater. A two-screen cinema in downtown Omaha's North Downtown (NoDo) area found within a development anchored by Omaha-based music label Saddle Creek Records. In February 2016, Film Streams announced that Susie Buffett's Sherwood Foundation had donated the 92-year-old Dundee Theater to the organization. The organization launched a public capital campaign in April 2017 with the intention of renovating and reopening the cinema by 2018. Film Streams' Dundee Theater reopened to the public on December 1, 2017.

The name "Film Streams" is inspired by Omaha (the word means "above all others on a stream") and the John Cassavetes film, Love Streams.

== The Ruth Sokolof Theater ==
The Ruth Sokolof Theater has two auditoriums with 35-millimeter platter and reel-to-reel projection capabilities. The larger theater seats 206 and runs first run feature films. The smaller theater seats 96 and shows a selection of classic films, retrospectives, and other films. Film Streams has DVD, Blu-ray, and digital high-definition projection.

Films Streams was inspired by joining with Saddle Creek Records, the indie record label based in Omaha, to build a mini-campus in a deserted downtown Omaha area. The block that is home to Film Streams also houses the Saddle Creek headquarters and Slowdown, a rock club the label operates.

=== Ruth Sokolof ===
Film Streams' North Downtown Omaha cinema is named after Ruth Sokolof, née Rosinsky (1925-1982), a well-known educator in Omaha who focused her life on helping children with disabilities. With her husband, Phil, many education-based scholarships are awarded in their name each year to Omaha-area students and educators.

== The Dundee Theater ==
Film Streams' Dundee Theater
- Interactive map of Film Streams' Dundee Theater
- Address: 4952 Dodge St; Omaha; United States
- Operator: Film Streams
- Type: Art house
- Screen: 2

Construction
- Opened: 1925
- Renovated: 2017

Website
- www.filmstreams.org

Film Streams announced plans to renovate and reopen Omaha's longest-running cinema in February 2016. When it reopened, it featured two screens: the historic 300-seat main house and a new 25-seat microcinema. The lobby is occupied by Lola's, a neighborhood cafe.

== Programming ==
Film Streams offers screenings of first-run films and a selection of retrospectives and classic films; education programs, and community development programs.

== See also ==
- Omaha, Nebraska: Media and popular culture
- Saddle Creek Records
- Slowdown (venue)
- Dundee–Happy Hollow Historic District
