= The Astro (La Vista, Nebraska) =

Live music venue in La Vista, Nebraska, U.S.

- Interactive map of The Astro
- Address: 8302 City Centre Dr., La Vista, Nebraska, U.S.
- Coordinates: 41.18338485574863°N 96.04126315139938°W
- Capacity: 2,400 (theater); 5,500 (amphitheater)
- Type: Live music venue

Construction
- Groundbreaking: September 2021
- Opened: September 2023

Website
- theastrotheater.com

The Astro is a live music venue located in La Vista, Nebraska, United States. It is a complex that contains the Astro Theater and Astro Amphitheater. The venue began construction in 2021 and officially opened in 2023.

== History ==
The Astro was officially announced in 2021 and broke ground in September of that same year. The venue had been in development for over 30 years prior. It was built because larger venues like CHI Health Center were too large for many bands to play at, so a medium size venue was seen as necessary to attract a wider variety of acts to the Omaha–Council Bluffs metropolitan area. The venue was developed by Omaha-based 1% Productions and Lawrence-based Mammoth. Construction began soon after and the venue was originally planned to open in January 2023. However, due to construction delays, the opening was delayed to late-September. The Astro officially opened on September 23, 2023 with its inaugural show being Casey Donahew.

== Design ==
The Astro consists of the Astro Theater and Astro Amphitheater. The theater has a capacity of 2,400 guests while the amphitheater has a capacity of 5,500. The theater was named for the Rose Blumkin Performing Arts Center in Omaha. The theater primarily uses a steel and concrete, with an exterior design using bricks and metal panels.
