= Cooper Foundation =

- Formation: 1934
- Type: Educational organization
- Headquarters: Lincoln, Nebraska, United States
- Chair: Jack Campbell
- Key people: Linda Crump; Connie Duncan; Brad Korell; T.J. McDowell Jr.
- Revenue: $1,521,726 (2015)
- Expenses: $1,128,798 (2015)
- Website: www.cooperfoundation.org

The Cooper Foundation of Lincoln, Nebraska, is a charitable and educational organization that supports nonprofit organizations in Lincoln and Lancaster County, Nebraska.

== Foundation ==
In 1934, Joseph H. Cooper, a long-time theater owner and former partner of Paramount Pictures established the Cooper Foundation. Joseph H. Cooper had filed a suit against Paramount Pictures for $200,000. The foundation once owned and operated fifteen theatres, in Colorado, Nebraska, Oklahoma, and Missouri. It sold off its theater interests in 1975.

== Cinerama theaters ==
In 1961 and 1962, the Cooper Foundation was instrumental in presenting Cinerama films and film production by building three theaters to showcase the three-projector Cinerama format. There were three of these, the so-called "Golden Triangle" in Glendale, Colorado, near Denver; St. Louis Park, Minnesota (a Minneapolis suburb); and Omaha, Nebraska.

Although existing theaters had been adapted to show Cinerama films, The Cooper Foundation designed and built three near-identical circular "super-Cinerama" theaters. They were considered the finest venues to view Cinerama films. The theaters were designed by architect Richard L. Crowther of Denver, a Fellow of the American Institute of Architects. The original blueprints for the theater are in the Denver Public Library Special Collections Department.

Crowther designed each element of the theaters to enhance the Cinerama experience. The circular design took advantage of the discovery that patrons, if left to their own devices, would seat themselves in an oval pattern. The exterior circular shape served as a constant reminder to passing motorists that this was a Cinerama theater. The design included a cylindrical shape and a flat roof.

The base of the building exteriors consisted of black Roman brick. The upper portion of the exteriors were clad in insulated Monopanels which were a burnt-orange color called "Swedish red".

=== Locations and current status ===
The first such theater, the Cooper Theater, in Glendale, near Denver, featured a 146-degree louvered screen (measuring a massive 105 feet by 35 feet), 814 seats, courtesy lounges on the sides of the theater for relaxation during intermission (including smoking facilities), and a ceiling which routed air and heating through small vent slots in order to inhibit noise from the building's ventilation equipment. It was demolished in 1994 to make way for a Barnes & Noble Bookstore.

The second, also called the Cooper Theater, was built in St. Louis Park, Minnesota at 5755 Wayzata Blvd. The last film presented there was Dances with Wolves in January, 1991, and at that time the Cooper was considered the flagship in the Plitt theater chain. It was torn down in 1992. Efforts were made to preserve the theater, but at the time it did not qualify for national or state historical landmark status (as it was not more than fifty years old) nor were there local preservation laws.

The third super-Cinerama, the Indian Hills Theater, was built in Omaha. The Indian Hills theater closed on Sept. 28, 2000, as a result of the bankruptcy of Carmike Cinemas, and the final film presented was the rap music-drama Turn It Up. Despite an intensive grass-roots campaign by local preservationists, support by film actors and the movie industry including Kirk Douglas, Charlton Heston, Janet Leigh, Ray Bradbury, the National Trust for Historic Preservation, and the American Society of Cinematographers, the owner, Nebraska Methodist Health Systems, Inc., went ahead with demolition on August 20, 2001, to make space available for a parking lot for its administration offices. (Ironically, on August 8, the Omaha Landmarks Heritage Preservation Commission had voted unanimously to recommend to the Omaha City Council that the Indian Hills be designated a Landmark of the City of Omaha. The building was destroyed anyway before the council met to take action.) The demise of the theatre and efforts to preserve others throughout the nation are chronicled in Jim Fields's documentary Preserve Me a Seat.

== The Foundation today ==
As of 2009, the Cooper Foundation continues to support nonprofit organizations in and around Lincoln, Nebraska. It also co-sponsors the E. N. Thompson Forum on World Issues along with the Lied Center for Performing Arts and the University of Nebraska–Lincoln.
