= Rialto Theater (Omaha, Nebraska) =

Movie theater in Omaha, Nebraska, US

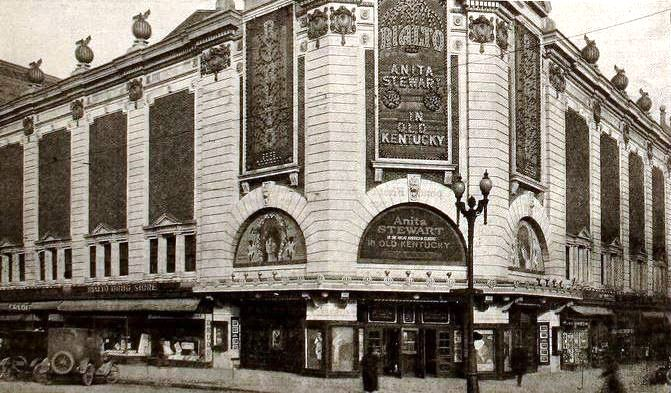
- Rialto Theater showing the film In Old Kentucky, circa 1919
- Interactive map of Rialto Theater
- Address: 1424 Douglas Street; Omaha, Nebraska; United States
- Coordinates: 41.2590°N 95.9353°W
- Owner: Blank Realty Co.
- Capacity: 2,500
- Type: Movie theater

Construction
- Opened: May 30, 1918
- Demolished: 1986
- Years active: 1918–1929
- Architect: John Latenser & Sons

The Rialto Theater was a movie theater located in Downtown Omaha, Nebraska. The theater opened in 1918 and closed in 1929. The theater was razed in 1986 to build a parking lot.

== History ==
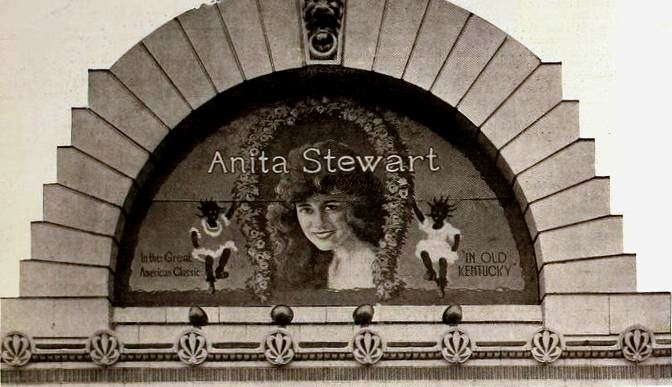
Arch Detail, Rialto Theater

The Rialto Theater was announced in 1917 as a theater, store, and office building. The building was built for the Blank Realty Company. Designed by John Latenser & Sons, the theater had a capacity of 2,500 people and broke ground later that year. Rialto Theater officially opened on May 30, 1918. In 1929, Rialto moved to a new location at the Gotham Building on South Main Street. The former theater was sold and then converted into a Pickwick-Greyhound Terminal.

Following the theater's move, the building was remodeled for commercial use. The final tenant of the building, Natelson's Inc., moved out of the building in 1985, leaving the building vacant. In 1986, it was announced that the theater would be demolished. While attempts were made to save the facade, the Kiewit Foundation rejected recommendations, and demolition was completed later that year.

== Architecture ==
The Rialto Theater was designed by John Latenser & Sons. The theater was of steel frame construction with concrete and masonry walls. The theater had a total capacity of 2,500 people. The theater's exterior was of old ivory and terra cotta, with accents of polychrome blues and reds.

== See also ==
- List of theaters in Omaha, Nebraska
