= Orpheum Theatre (Omaha) =

Historic theater in Omaha, Nebraska, U.S.

Coordinates: 41°15′22.74″N 95°56′10.3″W

Orpheum Theater
- The Orpheum
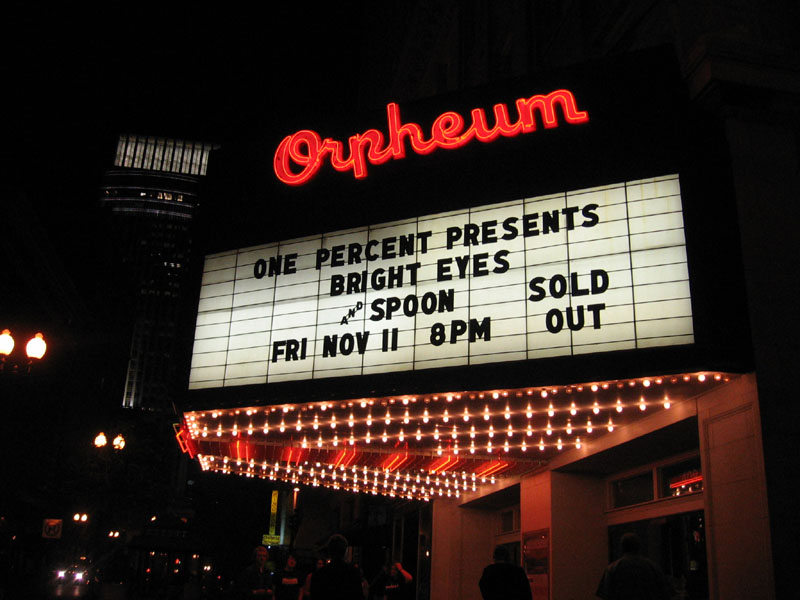
- Exterior of venue, showcasing the marquee (c. 2013)
- Address: 409 S 16th St; Omaha, Nebraska 68102-2602
- Location: Downtown Omaha
- Owner: City of Omaha
- Operator: Omaha Performing Arts Society
- Capacity: 2,600

Construction
- Groundbreaking: June 1926
- Opened: October 10, 1927
- Renovated: 1954; 1973–1975; 1996; 2002; 2017
- Closed: April 29, 1971
- Reopened: January 17, 1975
- Cost: $ 2 million ($36.4 million in 2025 dollars)

Website
- www.ticketomaha.com
- Orpheum Theater
- U.S. National Register of Historic Places
- Built: 1895; 1927
- Architect: Holabird & Roche; Lawrie, Harry
- Architectural style: Italianate
- NRHP reference No.: 73001061
- Added to NRHP: March 26, 1973

The Orpheum Theater is a historic theater located in Omaha, Nebraska, United States. The theater hosts programs best served by a more theatrical setting, including the Omaha Performing Arts Broadway Season, presented with Broadway Across America, and Opera Omaha's season. The theatre is listed on the National Register of Historic Places in 1973. The main auditorium is a proscenium theater known as "Slosburg Hall". The theater has a theatre organ, made by Wurlitzer.

== History ==
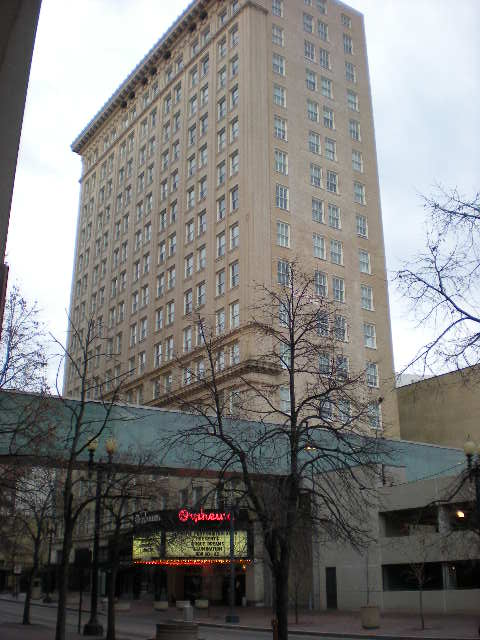
The theater's entrance with the Skylink above, 2009.

The current site of the building was previously home to the "Creighton Theater". John A. McShane organized a stock company to build the original theater in 1895. The architects for the original theater were Fisher & Lawrie and the general contractors were Rocheford & Gould. Paxton and Vierling installed the iron curtain that weighed 11 tons. The theater was named after John A. Creighton, a local philanthropist, and a large portrait of Count Creighton decorated the proscenium arch. The Creighton Theater was eventually added to the Orpheum Circuit, which by 1900 had expanded to nine western cities: Omaha, Chicago, Kansas City, New Orleans, Denver, Salt Lake City, Los Angeles, San Francisco and Sacramento. The reference to Creighton was eventually dropped from the theater's name.

By 1926 a new, larger theater was in the works. The current space was built in 1926 on the same site as the original Creighton Theater, but with its entrance situated on 16th Street. When vaudeville acts were no longer in fashion, a screen was added and the theater operated as a downtown movie theater from the 1940s through 1971. A year later, the Knights of Ak-Sar-Ben purchased the building and began a $2 million renovation and became a performing arts venue once again.

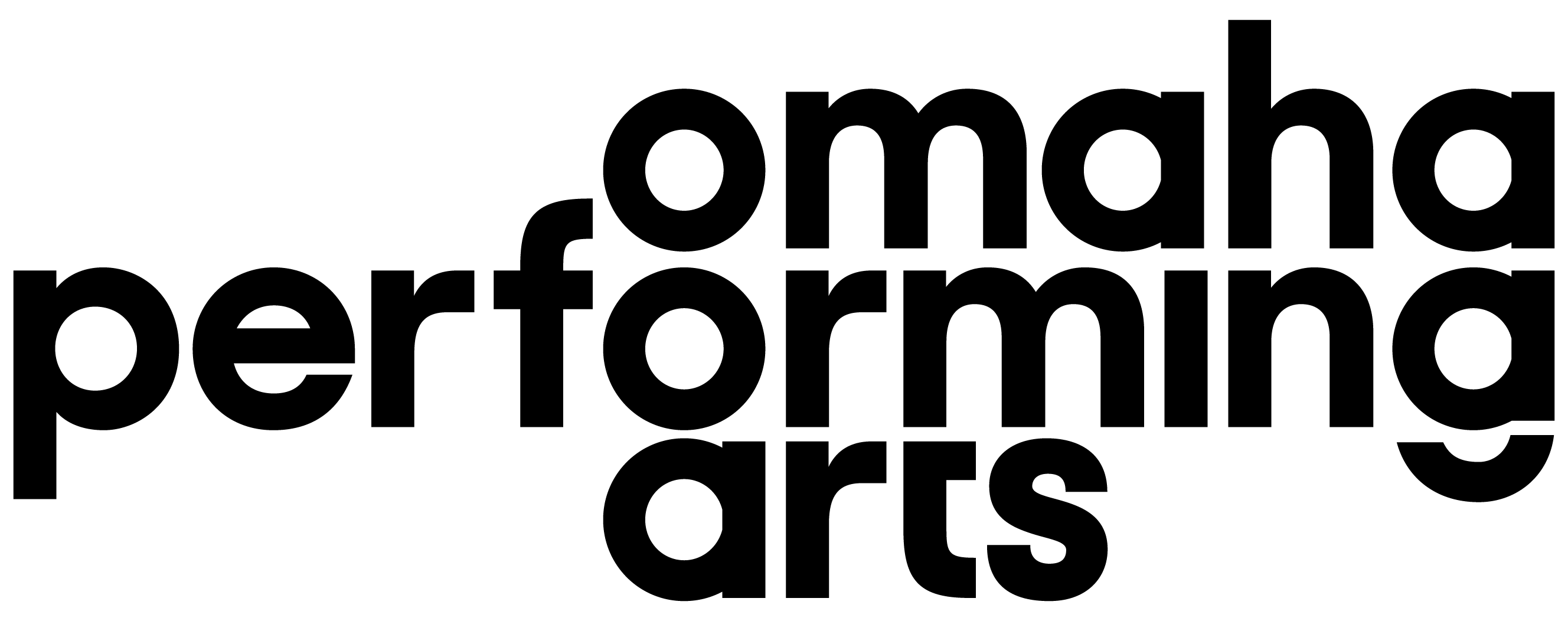
Omaha Performing Arts was formed in 2001 to oversee renovations of the Orpheum Theater

In 2002, Omaha Performing Arts Society assumed management of the Orpheum Theater from the City of Omaha, and the Orpheum underwent a $10 million renovation, making it capable of accommodating larger and more complicated scenery and sets. The Skylink was added in 2004 for increased convenience and accessibility to the theater. The 200-foot-long elevated, enclosed and climate-controlled walkway connects the OPPD parking garage to the venue. Omaha Performing Arts Society would later change its name to Omaha Performing Arts, and would build its permanent headquarters at Holland Performing Arts Center, north of the Orpheum.

In October 2013, the steel-letter marquee that was installed with the 1975 renovation was replaced with a digital electronic display board. The signage upgrades also included the installation of LED posters in the theater's lobby. During the summer of 2017, the theatre received a $3 million update, including paint, new carpeting and a refresh of seating.

== Architecture ==
The Orpheum Theater has been described as taking inspiration from the French Renaissance. The interior has vaulted, gilt ceilings, Czech crystal chandeliers, and gold and ivory finishes. The modern Orpheum Theater was designed in the 1920s by architectural firm Rapp and Rapp.

== See also ==
- History of Omaha
- List of theaters in Omaha, Nebraska
- City National Bank Building (Omaha)
- Theatre in Omaha
- Culture in Omaha, Nebraska
