= Indian Hills Theater =

Cinerama theater in Omaha, Nebraska, U.S.

- Interactive map of Indian Hills Theater
- Address: 8601 West Dodge Road, Omaha, Nebraska, U.S.
- Coordinates: 41.262466790349585°N 96.04717146459537°W

Construction
- Opened: December 1962
- Expanded: 1977; 1987
- Closed: September 28, 2000
- Demolished: August 2001

The Indian Hills Theater in Omaha, Nebraska, United States, was a movie theater built in 1962 showcasing films in the Cinerama wide-screen format. Its location was at 8601 West Dodge Rd. The theater's screen was the largest of its type in the United States. Despite the protests of local citizens, Hollywood legends, and the National Trust for Historic Preservation, the theater was demolished in 2001 by Nebraska Methodist Health System for a parking lot.

== History ==
The Indian Hills Theater opened in December 1962 and had a capacity of 806 persons. It was the first Cinerama theater in Nebraska and was originally operated by the Cooper Foundation.

In April 1977, an additional theater, known as, "Cameo," was announced and would add 300 seats. Cameo was completed in 1977 of that same year.

In August 1987, an addition two 200-seat auditoriums was announced. The addition was completed in December of that same year.

As a result of its then-operator, Carmike Cinemas, bankruptcy, Indian Hills Theater was closed in September 2000. The theater was believed to be one of only four theaters capable of showing Cinerama films in the United States. By December, many groups had shown interest in reopening, and even restoring the theater. By April 2001, Nebraska Methodist Health System made an offer to purchase the building. Despite initial hopes to restore the theater, Methodist announced that it would demolish the building and replace it with a parking lot.

Methodist refused to sell the building and refused to restore it itself, citing costs of $1.7 million. Actors such as Kirk Douglas, Janet Leigh, Patricia Neal, and director Robert Wise wrote letters to Methodist against demolition. In July 2001, 115 people gathered to protest the demolition. The National Trust for Historic Preservation announced its support for keeping the theater. Demolition work started on July 17 at the three smaller theaters. A city commission voted to give Indian Hills Theater landmark status. However, many did not believe that landmark status would prevent the building from being demolished, as demolition had already started. Demolition of the main theater began in August 2001.
