= Culture of Omaha, Nebraska =

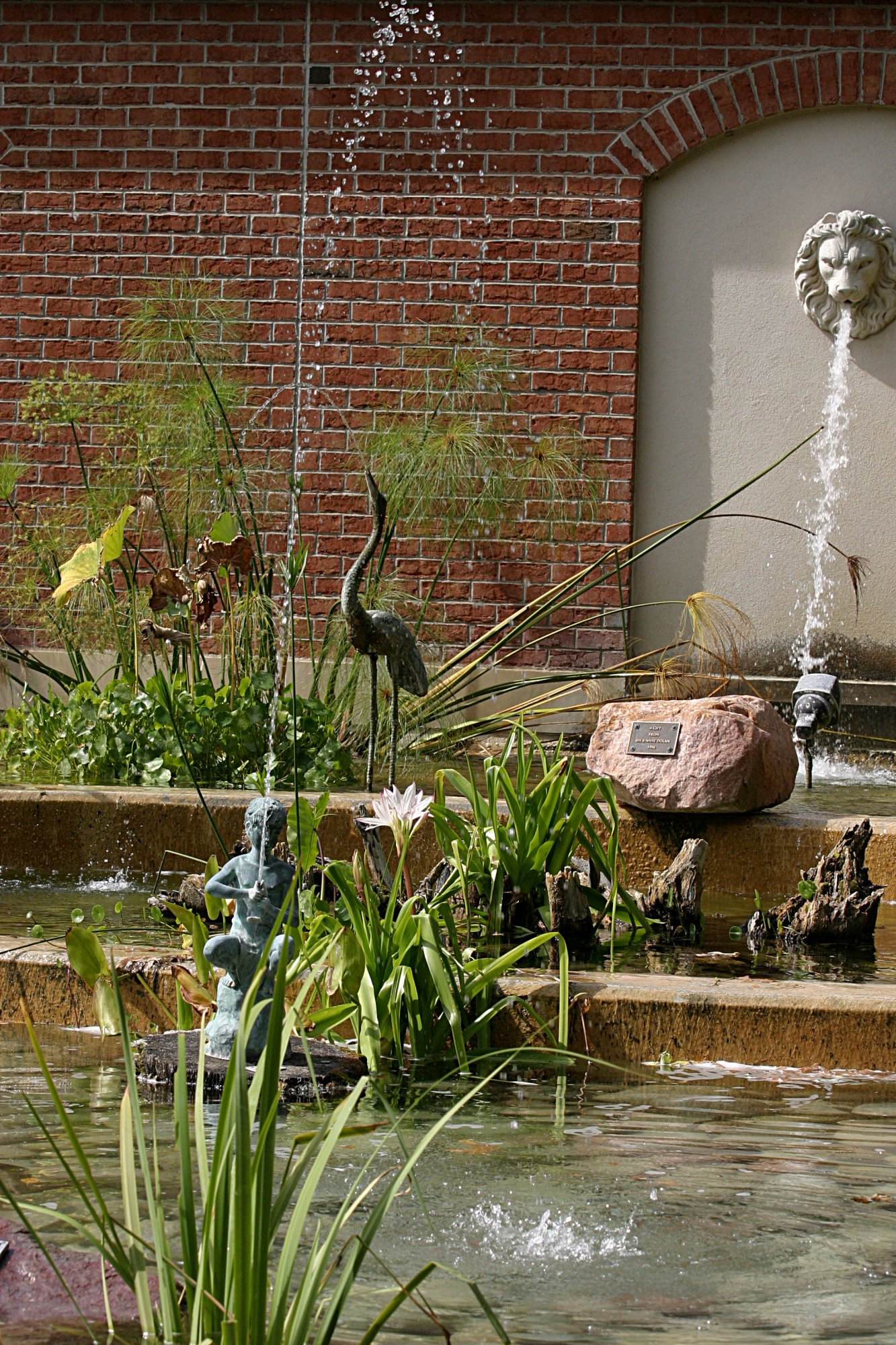
The Garden of the Senses Fountain at Omaha's Henry Doorly Zoo

The culture of Omaha, Nebraska, has been partially defined by music and college sports, and by local cuisine and community theatre. The city has a long history of improving and expanding on its cultural offerings. In the 1920s, the Omaha Bee newspaper wrote, "The cultural future of Omaha seems as certain of greatness as the commercial future... The symphony orchestra, the Art institute, the Community Playhouse and other organizations are on firm foundations and Omaha is destined to be not only a bigger, but a better city, both financially and culturally." Reviewing Omaha's contemporary arts scene in 2007, the New York Times hailed the city as having "a kind of cultural awakening".

The nationally recognized "Omaha Sound" describes the unique alternative rock scene in the city, and Big Joe Williams' 1953 minor hit "Omaha Blues" is about a woman in the city. The baseball College World Series has been held continuously in Omaha since 1950, and a disputed professional wrestling title was called the World Heavyweight Championship (Omaha version) during the 1950s and 1960s because promoters in the city hosted their own matches without sanctioning.

Fred Astaire and his sister Adele, Nick Nolte, Dorothy McGuire, Montgomery Clift and Marlon Brando were all born in Omaha, and Academy Award winner Henry Fonda grew up in the city and was encouraged to pursue acting by Marlon Brando's mother at the Omaha Community Playhouse, which she helped found.

== Museums ==
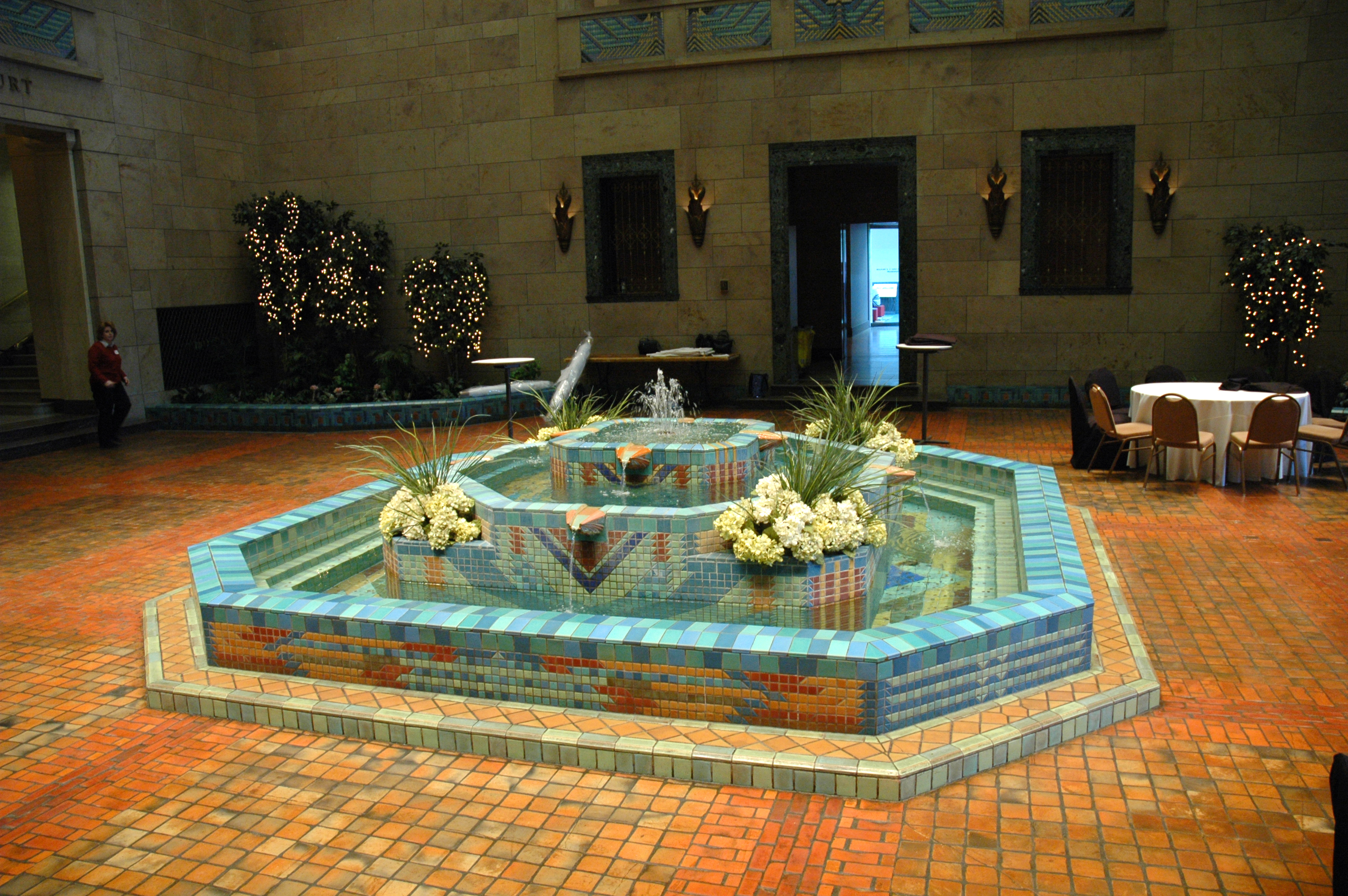
Joslyn Art Museum's tiled Fountain Court

Omaha has one major museum and several regionally important museums. The Joslyn Art Museum is nationally renowned for its collections of Native American art and art works relating to the early European exploration of western North America. The Durham Museum is located on 10th Street in the art deco Union Station. The museum has numerous permanent exhibits and is accredited with the Smithsonian Institution for traveling exhibits from the Smithsonian. Since its inception in 1976, Omaha Children's Museum has been a place where children can challenge themselves, discover how the world works and learn through play.

The Bemis Center for Contemporary Arts, just east of Omaha's Old Market Historic District, was founded in the early 1980s and hosts artists from all over the world. It is one of the nation's premier artists' colonies, founded by Ree Schonlau (Kaneko), wife of Japanese artist Jun Kaneko, who lives in Omaha and opened Museum Kaneko in 2007.

Other museums in Omaha include the Great Plains Black History Museum, celebrating the legacy of African Americans in Omaha and throughout the Midwest; and; the General Crook House Museum at Fort Omaha, exploring the role of the U.S. Army during the Indian Wars of the 1900s. General Crook was renowned for speaking on behalf of Chief Standing Bear of the Omahas during the landmark trial of Standing Bear v. Crook in 1879. El Museo Latino celebrates the legacy, art and culture of Latin America, and is the first Latino art and history museum in Omaha.

== Performing arts ==
The Omaha Symphony Orchestra, founded in 1921, and Opera Omaha, opened in 1958, are longtime bastions of the Omaha cultural scene. American Midwest Ballet is Nebraska's only resident professional ballet company, which performs at Witherspoon Hall at Joslyn Art Museum and Orpheum Theaters. The Omaha Community Playhouse is the largest, and one of the most famous and best-endowed community theaters in the United States. The Blue Barn Theatre and the Holland Performing Arts Center are venues located within Omaha.

The Shelterbelt Theatre focuses on the development of original theatrical works and provides practical theater education to playwrights, performers, creative and technical staff. The Omaha Area Youth Orchestra, the Magic Theatre, and the Omaha Modern Dance Collective are among other notable performing arts organizations in the area.

== Music ==
Omaha has a rich history in rhythm & blues and jazz as a regular stop for many Kansas City jazz bands and such homegrown talent as Wynonie Harris, Preston Love, Buddy Miles, and Luigi Waites. The city was also the subject of the Big Joe Williams song "Omaha Blues". During the 1960s several surf music bands came out of Omaha, of which The Rumbles has become the longest lasting.

According to one reviewer, "Tritely tagged 'emo' by writers everywhere, the Omaha Sound is as varied and complex as the 'Athens Sound'." Omaha is regarded by some as the "Indie Rock Capital" of the world. During the late 1990s, Omaha became nationally known as the birthplace of the successful rock band 311 and Saddle Creek Records, a record label featuring artists such as Bright Eyes, The Faint, and Cursive. Other major music groups either located in or originally from Omaha include Mannheim Steamroller, Azure Ray, Tilly and the Wall and the late indie-folk singer/songwriter Elliott Smith.

American Idol, a popular reality television show and talent competition broadcast on Fox network, chose Omaha as one of its auditioning cities for their seventh season in 2007 at the Qwest Center. David Cook, from Blue Springs, Missouri, was one of many to audition in the city, and he later went on to win that season in 2008.

== Cuisine ==
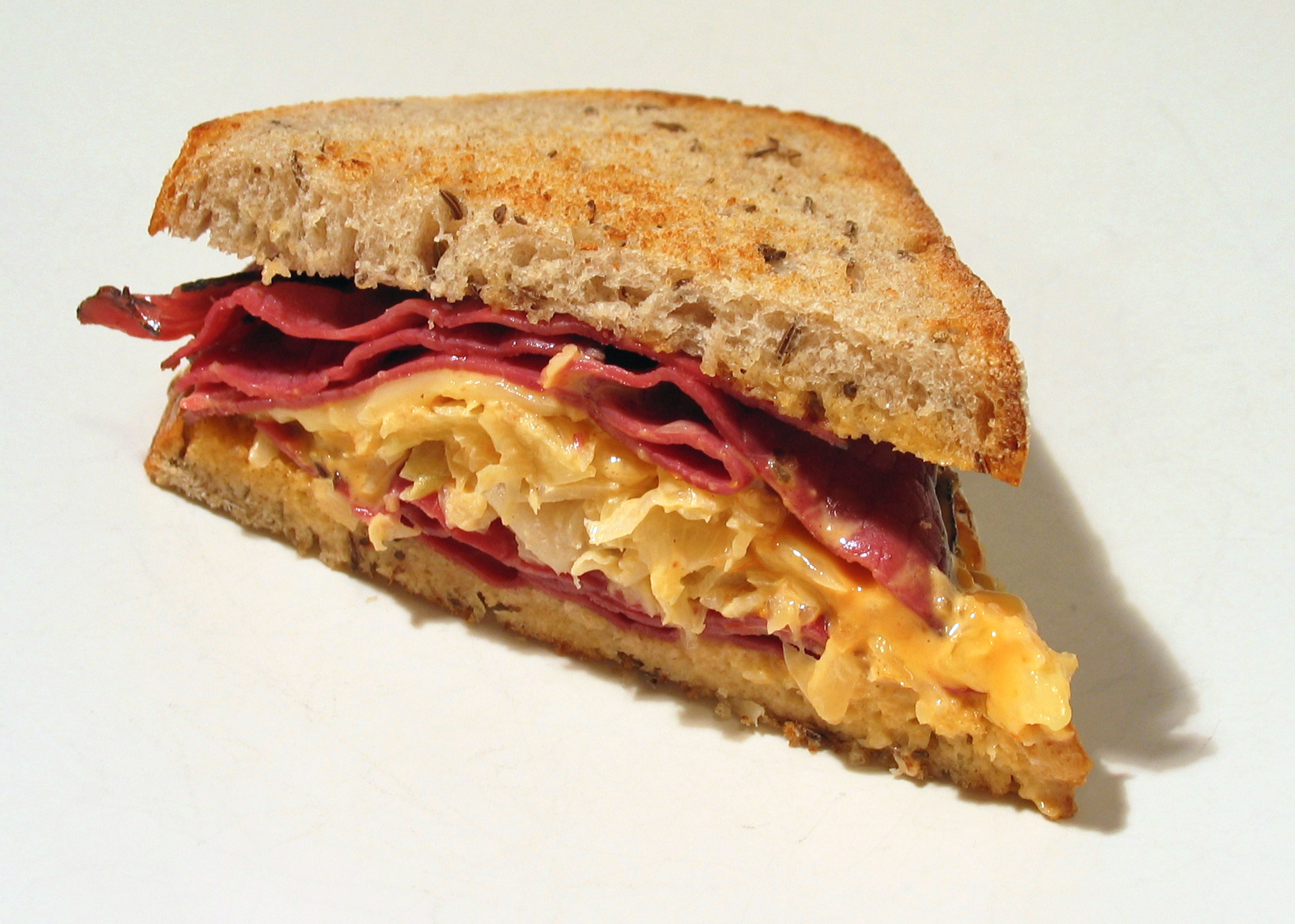
The Reuben sandwich: possibly invented in Omaha

Omaha has several major stockyards and renowned steakhouses, including Gorat's, the now defunct Mister C's, Omaha Steaks, and the Original Johnny's Cafe. This cultural legacy is also apparent in the name of the city's indoor football team, the Omaha Beef. Omaha also has a long history as a regional beer center, with the Krug, Storz, Metz Brewery and Willow Springs Brewery forming the city's "Big 4" breweries.

The Old Market in downtown Omaha includes more than 30 restaurants in this six-block historic district. ConAgra Foods, based in Omaha, supplies foods and ingredients to all types of restaurants, while Godfather's Pizza is a national chain that was founded in Omaha. The Reuben sandwich may have been invented in Omaha, and the collection of single malt Scotch whisky at Dundee Dell may be one of the largest in the United States.

== Sports ==
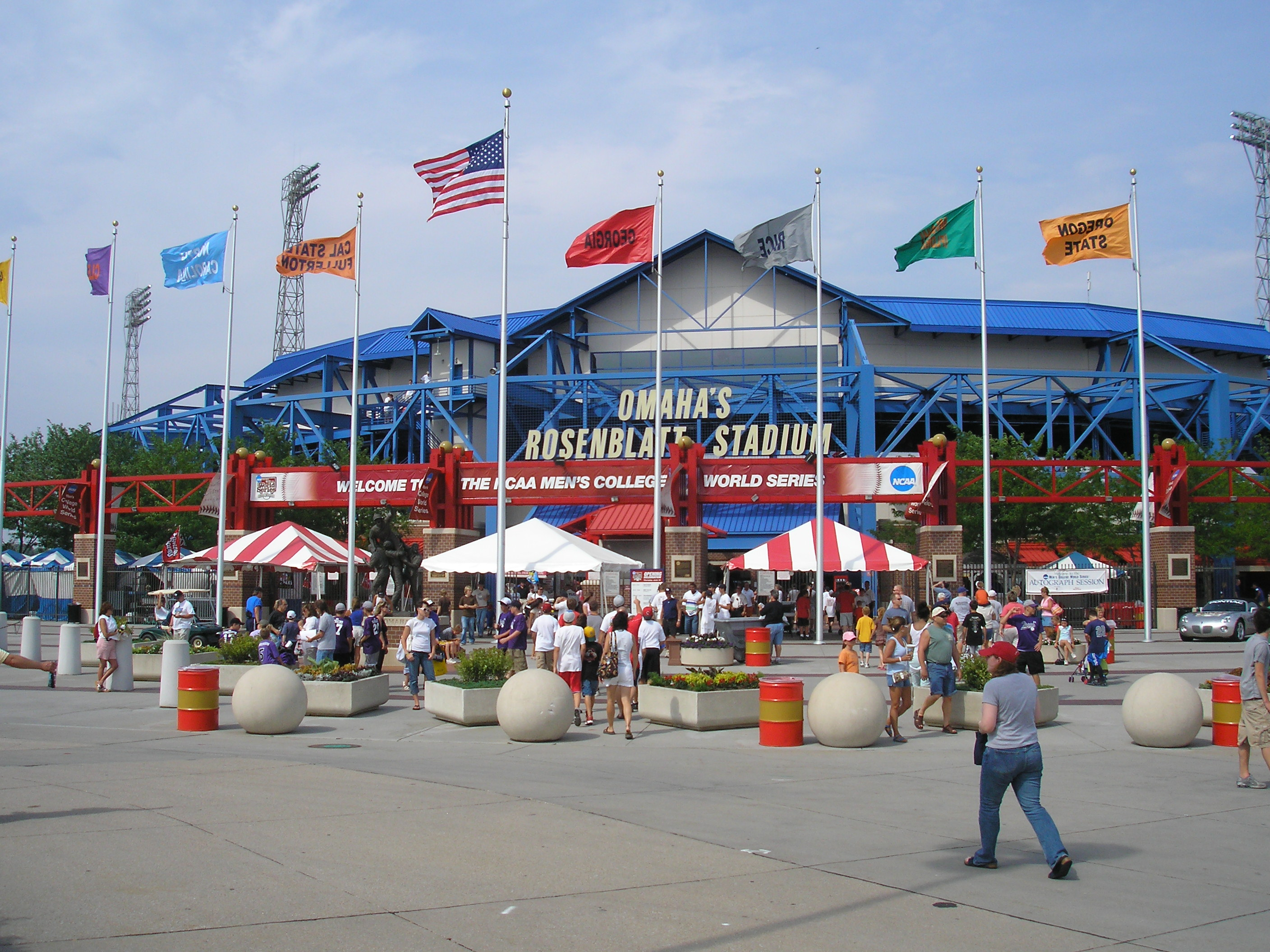
Main entrance to the Johnny Rosenblatt Stadium

Omaha's Johnny Rosenblatt Stadium was home to the Omaha Royals minor-league baseball team, now known as the Omaha Storm Chasers (the AAA affiliate of the Kansas City Royals). From 1950 until 2011, it hosted the annual NCAA College World Series men's baseball tournament in mid-June. The College World Series is now held at TD Ameritrade Park Omaha, and the Omaha Storm Chasers now play at Werner Park in Sarpy County. The Omaha Beef indoor football team plays at the Omaha Civic Auditorium. Other sports facilities in Omaha include Morrison Stadium, home of the Creighton Bluejays men's and women's soccer teams.

The Creighton Bluejays compete in a number of NCAA Division I sports. In addition to soccer, they play basketball and baseball.

Ice hockey is a popular spectator sport in Omaha. The two current Omaha-area teams include the Omaha Lancers, a United States Hockey League team that plays at the Omaha Civic Auditorium. The University of Nebraska Omaha Mavericks are an NCAA Division I team playing at Baxter Arena.

The Omaha Ak-Sar-Ben Knights were the American Hockey League affiliate of the Calgary Flames. The Knights played their home games at the Omaha Civic Auditorium. Following the 2006–07 season the Knights were relocated to the Quad Cities due to mounting losses taken on by the Calgary organization; they were renamed the Quad City Flames and replaced the Quad City Mallards of the United Hockey League.

Omaha is home to numerous important historical and modern sports figures, including Baseball Hall of Famer Bob Gibson; Gregg Olson, 1989 American League Rookie of the Year; Ron Prince, former head football coach at Kansas State University; Heisman Trophy winners Nile Kinnick, Johnny Rodgers, and Eric Crouch; and Gale Sayers, a Pro Football Hall of Famer.

== Festivals and parades ==
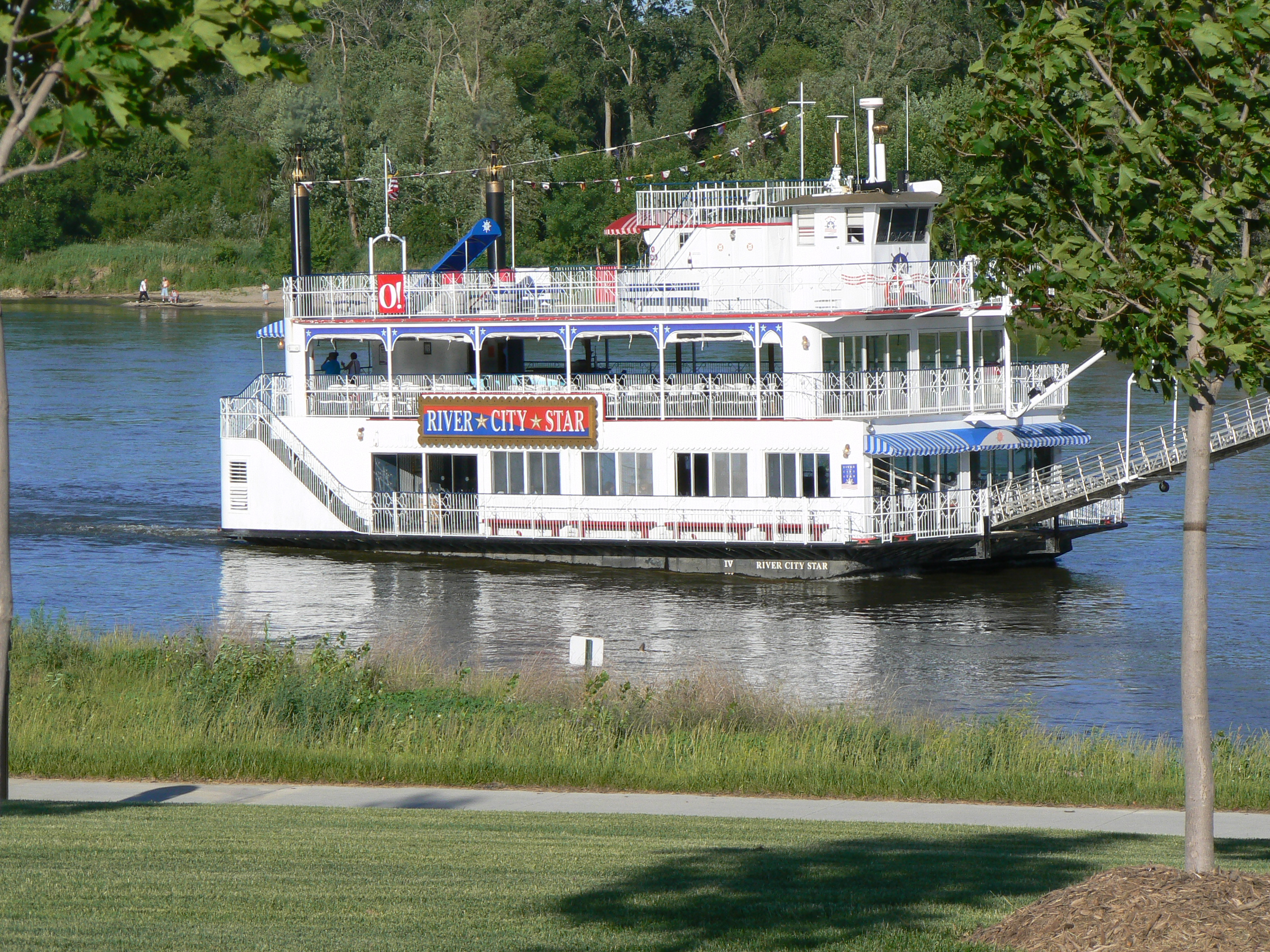
River City Star paddlewheel on the Missouri River

Native Omaha Days is a long-time tradition of North Omaha's African American community. A bi-annual celebration includes dozens of events throughout the Near North Side, including dances, family reunions, and other events. A large parade features notable North Omahans, as well as marching bands and floats.

The Omaha Blues, Jazz, & Gospel Festival and Florence Days are two other important local events.

== Film ==
In 1939, the world premiere of the film Union Pacific was held in Omaha. The accompanying three-day celebration drew 250,000 people, doubling the population of the city and requiring the National Guard to help keep order. A special train from Hollywood to Omaha carried director Cecil B. DeMille and stars Barbara Stanwyck and Joel McCrea.

The 1977 Elvis in Concert television special in Omaha is considered by many experts to be the worst concert Elvis ever performed. The show was filmed, though, and some of the performances made it into the special, including the great performance of "How Great Thou Art", probably the only good performance of the concert.

Omaha has been showcased by a handful of relatively big budget motion pictures and by productions with a lesser budget, including the adventure Omaha (The Movie).

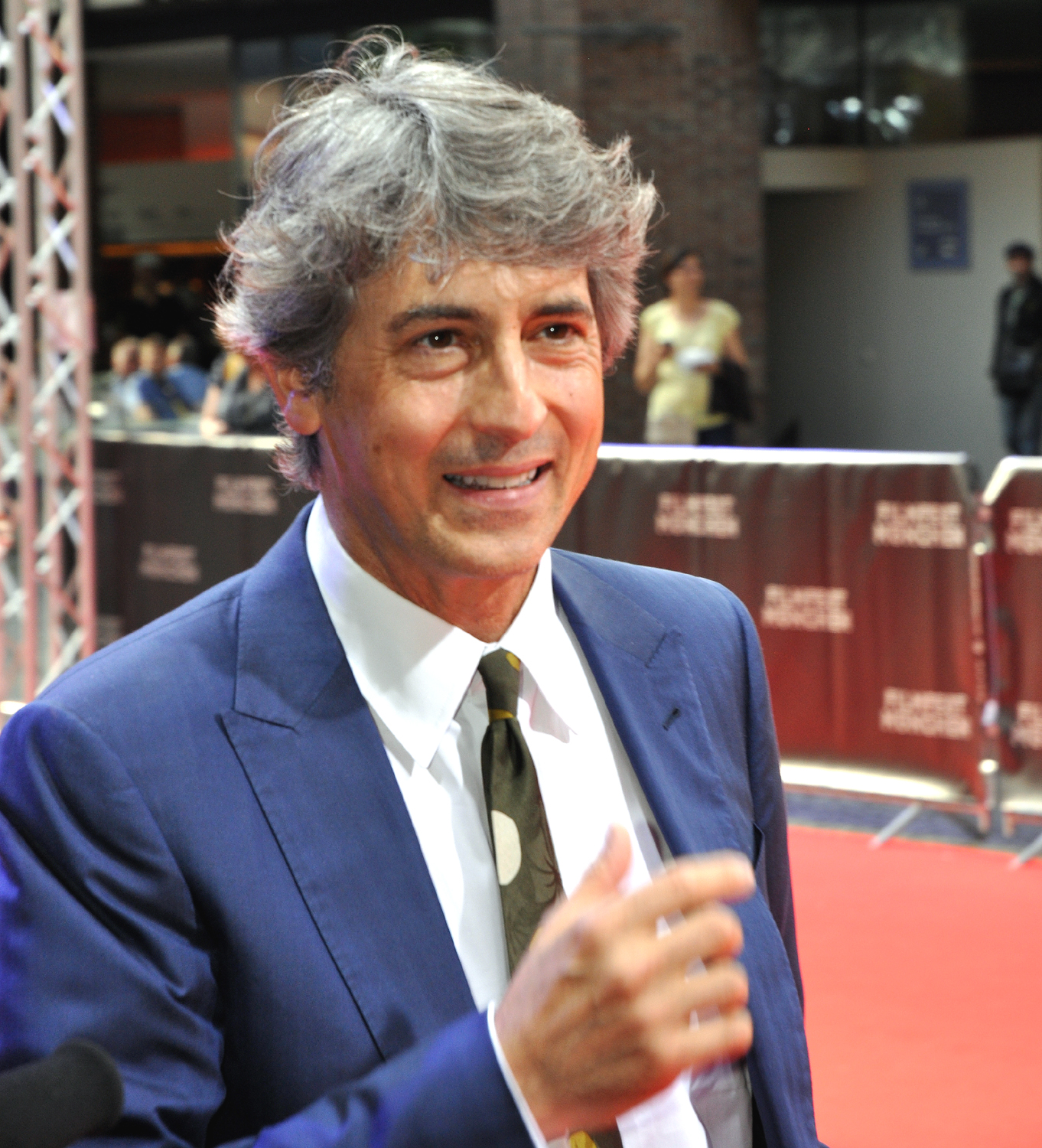
Alexander Payne, movie director from Omaha

The city's most extensive exposure can be accredited to Omaha native Alexander Payne, the Oscar-nominated director shot parts of About Schmidt, Citizen Ruth and Election in the city; his handling of the scenes suggests a deep-rooted love for his hometown, exemplified by his decision to eventually make a feature film called Nebraska. Portions of The Assassination of Richard Nixon and The Indian Runner were also shot in Omaha, including scenes of the now demolished Delmar Hotel. In 2005, Payne joined the board of directors of Film Streams, a nonprofit arts organization opening a two-screen cinema in downtown Omaha.

The demolition of Omaha's Indian Hills Theater, at one time the largest Cinerama in the nation, remains a source of contention between the local artistic community and Methodist Hospital. At present, the Dundee Theatre is the lone surviving single-screen movie theater in the city.

== Media ==
The Omaha metropolitan area is served by the Omaha World-Herald, the city's major newspaper, as well as suburban newspapers and independent newspapers and magazines including The Reader and Omaha Magazine. The Omaha Star, founded in 1938 in North Omaha, is Nebraska's only African-American newspaper.

The Omaha World-Herald is the largest employee-owned newspaper in the United States, and also has one of the highest penetration rates, meaning the percentage of the population in the country that subscribes to the newspaper. The Omaha World-Herald Freedom Center is a $200 million printing press facility on the north end of downtown.

== People ==
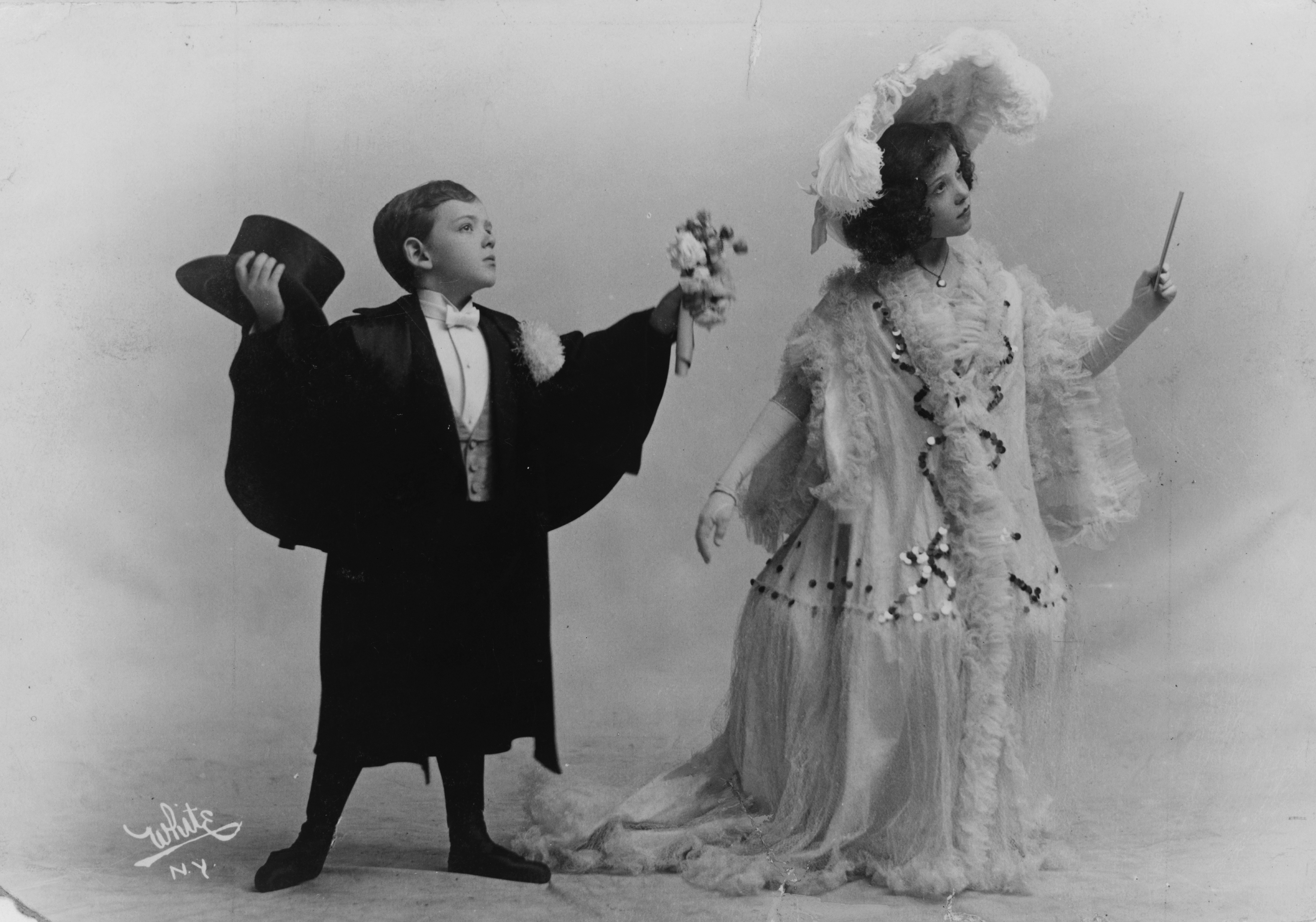
Fred and Adele Astaire circa 1906 in Omaha

Omaha is the historic and modern birthplace and home of many notable politicians, actors, musicians, business leaders and cultural leaders. Malcolm X was born here in 1925. A variety of actors, including Fred and Adele Astaire, Nick Nolte, Dorothy McGuire, Marlon Brando and Gabrielle Union, were born in Omaha. Academy Award winner Henry Fonda grew up in Omaha and was encouraged to pursue acting by Marlon Brando's mother at the Omaha Community Playhouse, which she helped found. Montgomery Clift came from Omaha, and his family's home still stands on South 33rd Street, a few blocks from the Gerald Ford birthplace site, which memorializes the 38th President. Omaha's rich musical heritage includes legends such as Wynonie Harris, Preston Love, Buddy Miles, Calvin Keys, and Eugene McDaniels. The modern music scene includes the members of 311. The third wealthiest person in the world, Warren Buffett, also lives in Omaha.

=== Ethnic and racial groups ===
Native Americans, including Omaha, Pawnee, Otoe, Sioux, Missouria and Ioway, have occupied the area for thousands of years. As the city of Omaha has grown, it has thrived from the contributions of people from nations around the world. Early populations to settle in the city included Belgians, Czechs, Irish, Germans, Italians, Swedes and Norwegians, African Americans, Greeks, Poles, Jews and Slovaks. Today there are growing populations of Sudanese, Mexicans, and Latinos from throughout Central and South America.

== Other cultural highlights ==
A portion of Omaha's renovated downtown area is known as the Old Market. Part of the former "Jobbers Canyon" that included fruit markets, warehouses and other agricultural and industrial buildings, it is home to a number of shops, restaurants, bars, and art galleries. The area also has uneven brick roads, horse-drawn carriages, and street performers.

Between the zoo and the Old Market lies the Omaha Botanical Gardens (also known as Lauritzen Gardens). This 100-acre (40 ha) botanical garden features 13 outdoor areas, including a rose garden, herb garden, children’s garden and an arboretum. Recognizing Union Pacific's long history in Omaha, situated on the grounds of Lauritzen Gardens is the new Kenefick Park, featuring two of the largest locomotives ever used in the United States - Big Boy #4023, a steam engine, and Centennial #6900. These locomotives overlook Interstate 80 for motorists entering from Iowa.

There are numerous community gardens across the neighborhoods of Omaha, including Big Garden, Big Muddy Urban Farm, Benson Community Garden, City Sprouts, Dundee Community Garden, Farnam Farm Garden, Gifford Park Community Garden, Hands to Harvest Community Garden, and New Omaha Garden Park.

Omaha is home to a number of nonprofit and charity organizations, including Father Flanagan's famous Girls and Boys Town. Omaha's Henry Doorly Zoo is widely considered one of the premier zoos in the world. The River City Star provides cruises on the Missouri River from the historic Miller's Landing in downtown Omaha.

There are a number of visual and performance artists from Omaha, including Edward Ruscha.

Omaha has five sister cities: Shizuoka, Japan (1965); Braunschweig, Germany (1992); Siauliai, Lithuania (1996); Naas, Ireland (2002); and Xalapa, Mexico (2005).

The annual Midwest Humanist and Freethought Conference, since 2013 known as Apostacon, was held in Omaha in 2011–2014.

== See also ==
- Culture in North Omaha, Nebraska
- Tourism in Omaha, Nebraska
- Theatres in Omaha (category)
