= Cuisine of Omaha =

Culinary traditions of Omaha, Nebraska

Omaha's Spaghetti Works restaurant in the Old Market

The cuisine of Omaha reflects the heritage and culture of Omaha, Nebraska.

== About ==
Omaha has many steakhouses, several of which are Sicilian in origin and located in a section of town known as Little Italy or adjacent to the Omaha Stockyards.

Mister C's was a renowned steakhouse in North Omaha founded by one of the Caniglia brothers. After operating for more than 55 years, the restaurant closed in 2007. Gorat's was founded in 1944, and still operates from its original location where Omaha billionaire Warren Buffett regularly dines.

Both Central European and Southern influence can be seen in the local popularity of carp, and there are numerous delis throughout the city, including the historic Dundee Dell in the Dundee neighborhood.

South 24th Street contains a multitude of Mexican restaurants, and North Omaha has its own barbecue style; the city also has a barbecue society. The Old Market has several locally and nationally renowned restaurants.

Bronco's Hamburgers, Godfather's Pizza, and the Old Fashioned Garden Cafe (the latter of which closed in 2022) are among the chain restaurants that originated in Omaha.

== Notable foods ==
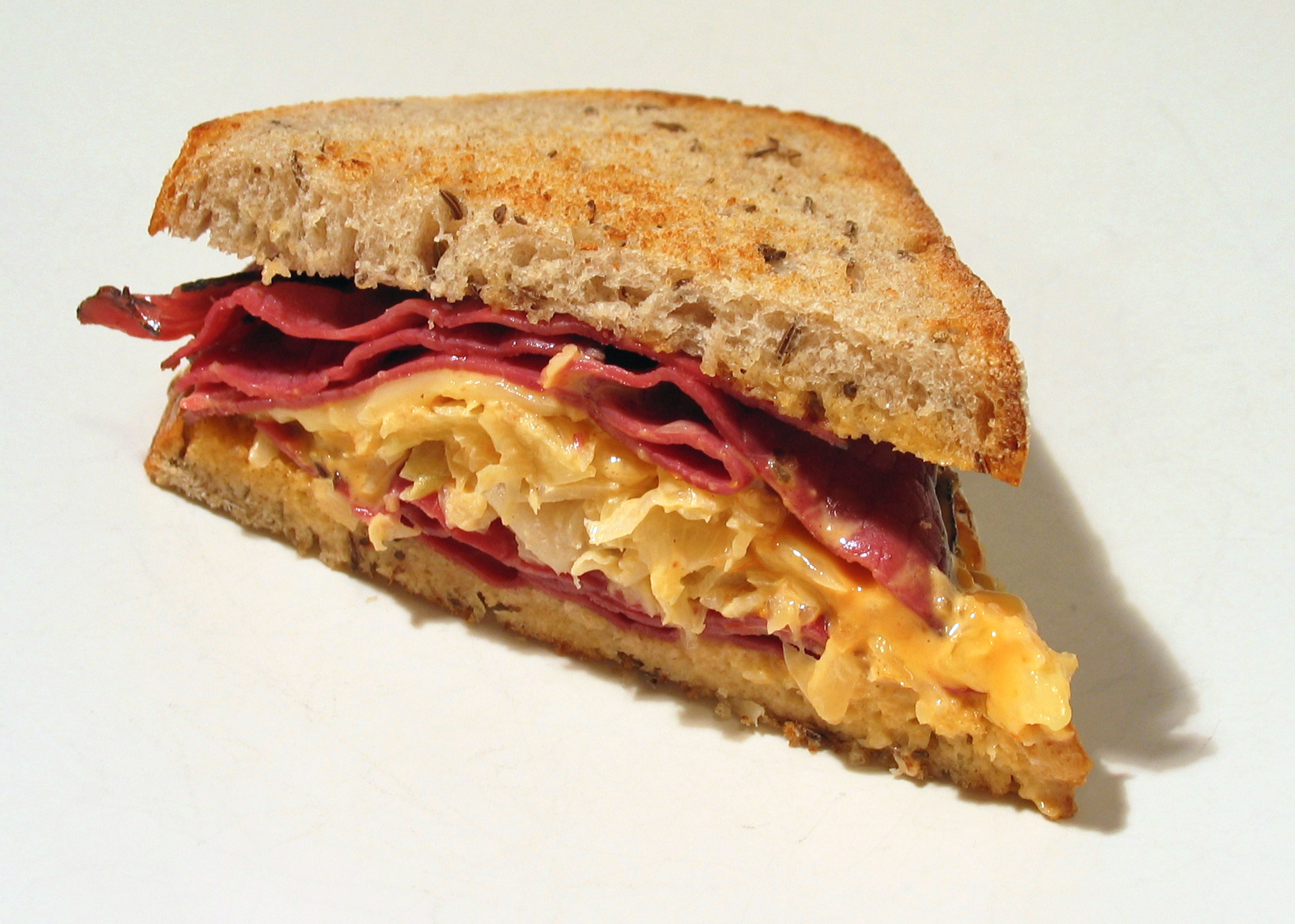
Half of a Reuben sandwich

The origins of the Reuben sandwich reputedly are in Omaha. Reuben Kulakofsky (sometimes spelled Reubin, whose last name is sometimes shortened to Kay) was a grocer in Omaha.

Kay was the inventor of the sandwich, perhaps as part of a group effort by members of Kulakofsky's weekly poker game held in the Blackstone Hotel from approximately 1920 to 1935. The participants, who nicknamed themselves "the committee", included the hotel's owner, Charles Schimmel. The sandwich first gained local fame when Schimmel put it on the Blackstone's lunch menu.

The Runza may be the most well known fast-food item in local Omaha culture, a "yeast dough bread pocket with a filling consisting of beef, cabbage or sauerkraut, onions, and seasonings," probably originating in the Russian pirogi or pirozhki.

== Notable businesses ==
Omaha Steaks is a family business that manufactures, markets, packages, and distributes premium beef, seafood and other foods. It was founded in 1917 by Latvian emigrants as the "Table Supply Meat Company"; the name was taken from the previous occupants of the building, the Table Supply Company. The company changed its name to Omaha Steaks International in 1966, and has used "Omaha Steaks" in marketing ever since.

Conagra Brands is one of North America's largest packaged foods companies. Conagra's products are available in supermarkets, as well as restaurants and food-service establishments. Its major brands include Healthy Choice, Marie Callender's frozen foods, Peter Pan peanut butter, Hebrew National hot dogs, Swiss Miss hot cocoa and Wesson cooking oil.

== See also ==
- Cuisine of the Midwestern United States

== Image gallery ==
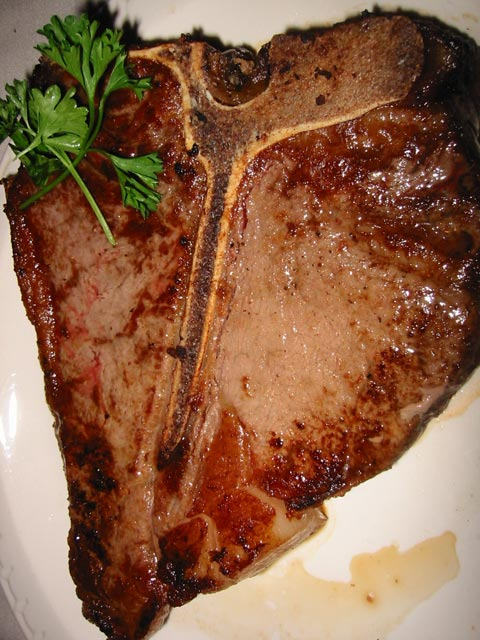
A griddle-cooked T-bone steak at Gorat's

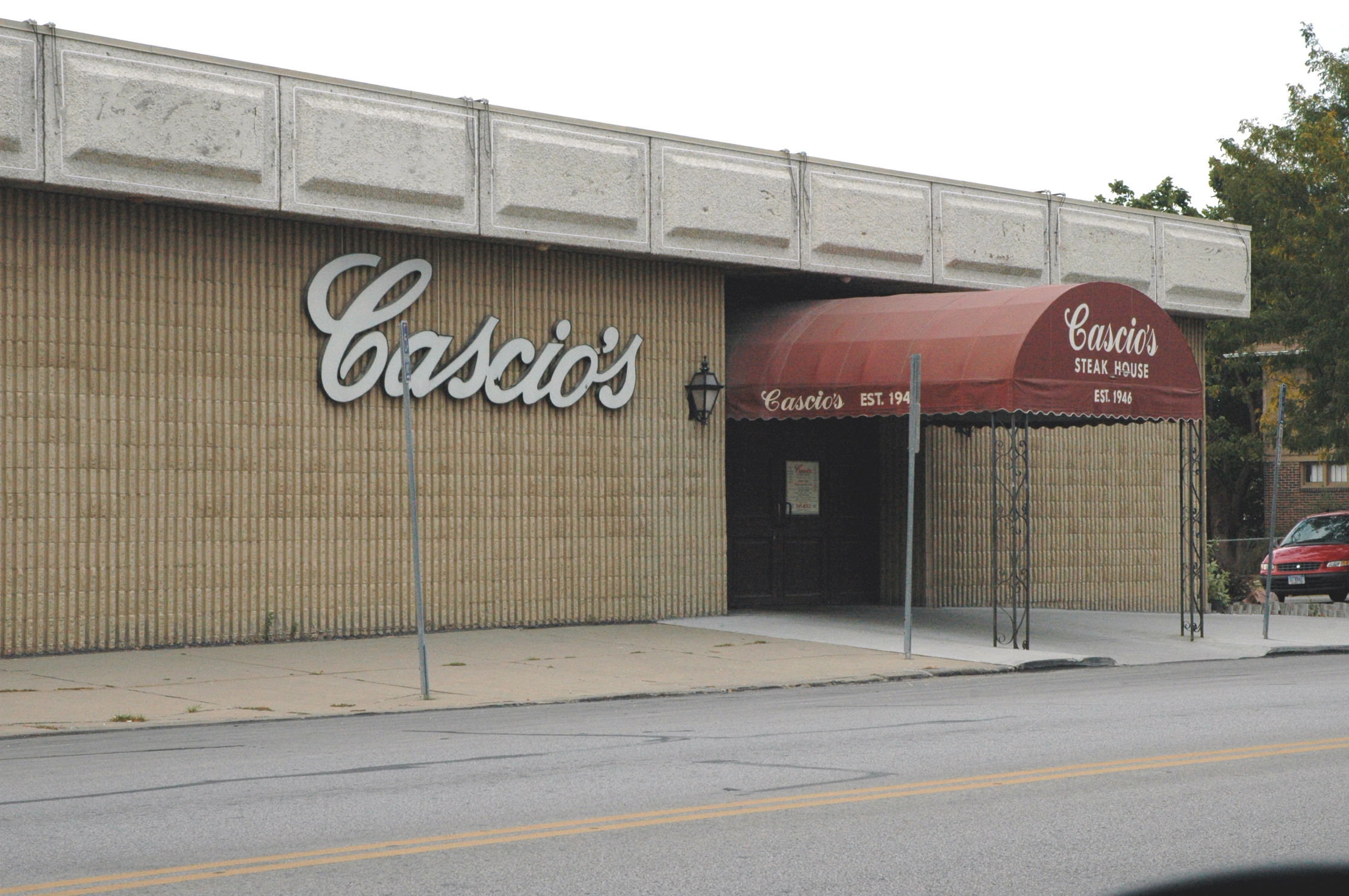
Cascio's Steakhouse at 1620 South 10th Street in Little Italy

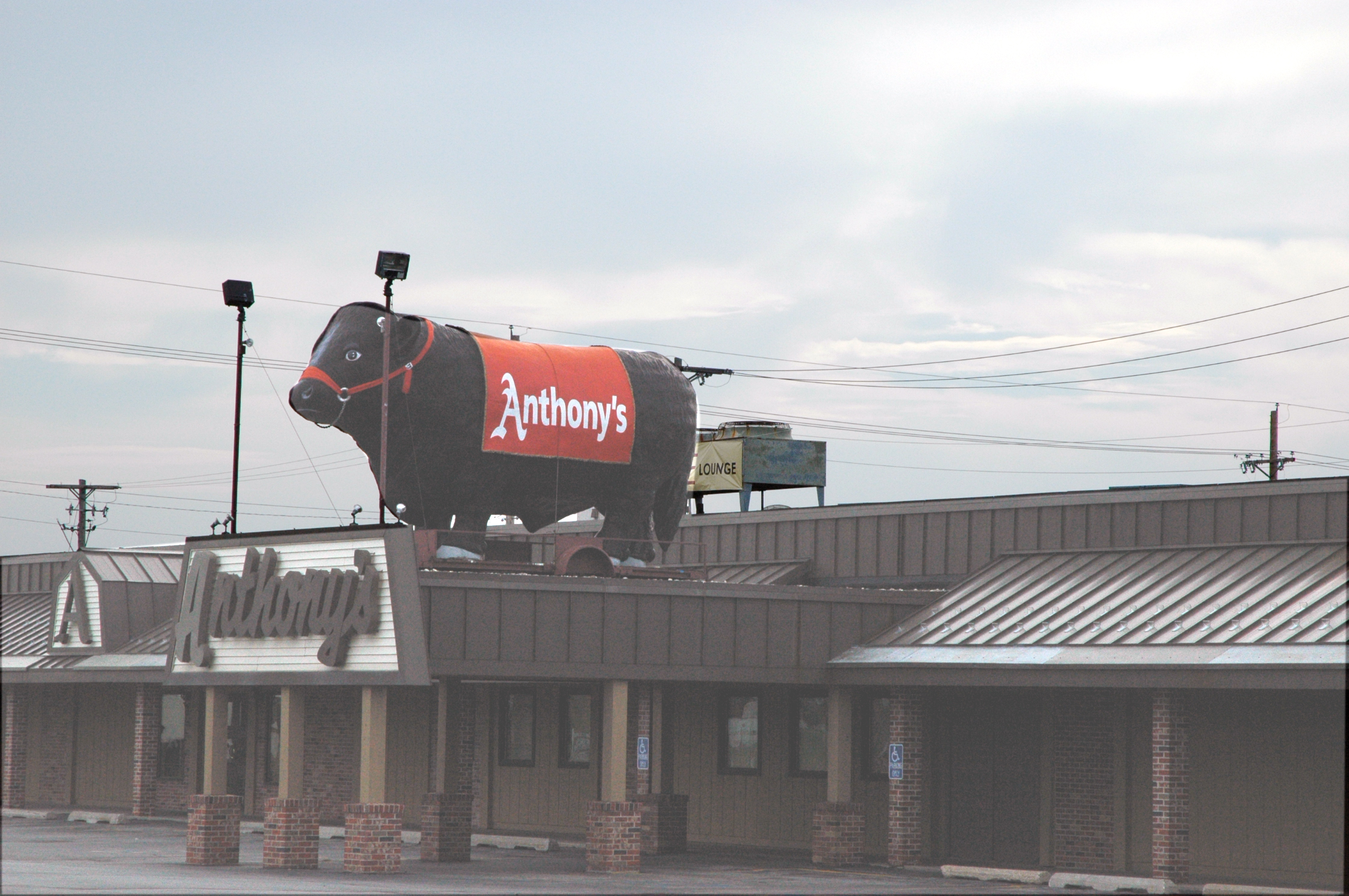
Anthony's Steakhouse at 7220 F Street in South Omaha. The restaurant closed in 2022.
