= Theatre in Omaha, Nebraska =

Note on spelling: "While most Americans use "er" (as per American spelling conventions), the majority of venues, performers and trade groups for live theatre use "re." "Theatre" references the artform. "Theater" references the venue in which that artform is performed.

Theatre in Omaha has existed since the founding of the city in 1856. Nationally notable actors have come from the city. There are active community theatres, and some theatres and acting companies have reached national prominence.

== Theatres ==
Omaha is home to the Omaha Community Playhouse. It is the largest, one of the most famous, and one of the best-endowed community theaters in the United States. It produces its own season of plays and musicals. The city has a number of other long-standing theatres, including the Orpheum Theater and the Rose Theater. And The Sokol Auditorium are booked for dramatic performances or touring productions occasionally, as well. Other theatres in Omaha include the Blue Barn Theatre, Holland Performing Arts Center, Ralston Community Theatre, and Papillion-LaVista Community Theatre

The Magic Theatre has provided a space for experimental theatre in the city for more than 30 years. The John Beasley Theater & Workshop produced contemporary plays as well as providing many aspects of theater training in the Near North Side community. The Chanticleer Community Theater in neighboring Council Bluffs, Iowa also serves the greater metropolitan area. The Grande Olde Players Theater Company has been performing throughout the city for some time, as well. The Shelterbelt Theatre focuses on the development of original theatrical works and provides practical theater education to playwrights, performers, creative and technical staff.

== Actors and actresses ==
These are actors who were either born in Omaha or lived there for an extensive period of time.

- Craig Anton—actor, comedian
- Adele Astaire—dancer, entertainer
- Fred Astaire—dancer, actor
- John Beasley—actor
- Marlon Brando—actor
- Montgomery Clift—actor
- James M. Connor—actor
- Nicholas D'Agosto—actor
- Adam DeVine—actor, comedian
- David Doyle—actor
- Mary Doyle—actress
- Henry Fonda—actor
- Jane Fonda—actress
- Peter Fonda—actor
- Jorge Garcia—actor
- Hallee Hirsh—actress
- Jay Karnes-actor
- Jaime King—actress, model
- Chris Klein—actor
- Swoosie Kurtz—actress
- Dorothy McGuire—actress
- Nick Nolte—actor
- Alexander Payne—screenwriter/director
- Anne Ramsey—actress
- Andrew Rannells—actor
- Gabrielle Union—actress
- Julie Wilson—actress
- Johnny Carson—talk show host/comedian

== See also ==
- Culture in Omaha, Nebraska
- Theatres in Omaha (category)
