= Ree Kaneko =

- Born: Ree Troia Schonlau; February 1, 1946 (age 80); Omaha, Nebraska US
- Other name: Ree Schonlau
- Occupations: Artist; Arts administrator Curator; Arts consultant
- Years active: 1971-present
- Known for: Jun Kaneko Studio; Bemis Center for Contemporary Arts
- Notable work: Bemis Center for Contemporary Arts

Ree Kaneko (née Schonlau) (born February 1, 1946) is an American artist, arts administrator, and arts consultant from Omaha, Nebraska.

== Early life ==
Kaneko, born in Omaha, Nebraska, grew up in a working-class neighborhood near the Old Market in a neighborhood called Little Italy. Growing up, Kaneko wanted to become an artist. In 1968, Kaneko graduated from the University of Omaha, now known as University of Nebraska at Omaha, with a Bachelor of Fine Arts, specializing in ceramics. She went to New York, and returned to Omaha in 1971.

== Career ==
Kaneko was a studio artist for 11 years and served as founder and director of Ree Schonlau Gallery in Omaha from 1971 to 1984. She founded the Craftsmen's Guild and Omaha Brickworks, both of which offered workshops and art classes. She founded Alternative Worksite, an Artist-in-Industry program, in 1981. All of these arts organizations Kaneko ran were based in Old Market, rented spaces from the Mercer family of Omaha. At the time, Omaha was not regarded as a center for visual arts.

=== Bemis Center for Contemporary Arts ===
In 1986, the Alternative Worksite, an Artist-in-Industry program, became Bemis Center for Contemporary Arts. The Bemis is a nonprofit arts organization that includes galleries and a competitive residency program for artists. The Bemis was a collaboration between Kaneko, her sculptor husband Jun Kaneko, ceramic artist Tony Hepburn, and visual arts curator and professor Lorne Faluk. Kaneko founded Bemis and served as its executive director until 2001, when she and husband Jun Kaneko dedicated their efforts to founding a new center for creativity in downtown Omaha, called KANEKO.

=== KANEKO ===
In 1998, the Kanekos opened a non-profit organization called KANEKO: Open Space for Your Mind, to support and promote creativity. An old downtown Omaha Plymouth dealership was purchased and renovated to use as art storage space as well as a nonprofit center for creative studies. KANEKO now encompasses three turn-of-the-century warehouses in the Old Market District of Omaha. Kaneko was instrumental in curating the first exhibit celebrating Omaha designer's Cedric Hartman's career at KANKEO in 2014.

== Awards and honors ==
- 1991: Kaneko received UNO's Distinguished Alumna Award
- 2012: Kaneko and her husband were honored by the Omaha Business Hall of Fame
- 2020: Kaneko and her husband received a Lifetime Achievement Award by Omaha Entertainment and Arts Awards (OEAAs)

== Personal life ==
Kaneko is married to sculptor Jun Kaneko. The couple first met when Kaneko attended a workshop on Ceramic Sculpture with Tony Hepburn, held June 8–14, 1981, at the Omaha Brickworks.

Kaneko has two daughters, Susan Schonlau and Troia Schonlau, from a prior marriage. Both daughters work at the Kaneko Studio.

== Works or publications ==
- Schonlau, Ree. Earthcooks. Omaha, Neb: Craftsmen Gallery, 1982. OCLC 53985142
  - Includes photo documentation of a functional pottery cookware exhibit, photos of the artists, and favorite recipes of the artists held at the Craftsmen's Gallery, Omaha, Nebraska. Introduction by Ree Schonlau
- Hepburn, Tony, 1942-, Jun Kaneko, Faye, 1950- Munroe, Ree Schonlau, and Lorne Falk. Convergent Territories: The Gallery As Artist's Studio : Tony Hepburn, Jun Kaneko, Faye Munroe : Walter Phillips Gallery, the Banff School of Fine Arts, Banff, Alberta, October 19-November 7, 1982. Banff, Alta: Walter Phillips Gallery, 1982. OCLC 150426757
  - Catalogue of an exhibition; essays, Ree Schonlau and Lorne Falk.
- Kaneko, Jun. Ceramics by Jun Kaneko. Omaha, NE: Ree Schonlau Gallery, 1983. OCLC 14210701
  - 20 ceramic constructions made by Jun Kaneko between 1971 and 1983; list includes title, size, date of construction for each work.
- Schonlau, Ree, and Patrick Siler. Chicago Vicinity Clay VI: A Juried Exhibition Open to Artists Residing Within 280 Miles of Chicago. Chicago, Ill: Lill Street Gallery, 1987. OCLC 47994579
  - Catalog of an exhibition held at Lill Street Gallery, June 26-Aug. 23, 1987 and at the State of Illinois Art Gallery, July 20-Sep. 11, 1987. Jurors, Ree Schonlau, Patrick Siler.
- Schonlau, Ree, and Steve Joy. Working Space: Selections from the Bemis Center for Contemporary Arts : [Exhibition] May 2-June 28, 1998. Omaha, Neb: Bemis Center for Contemporary Arts, 1998. OCLC 41282873
  - Catalog of an exhibition held at the Sioux City Art Center, Sioux City, Iowa; Text (p. 2) by Ree Schonlau and Steve Joy.
- Schlanger, Jeff, and Ree Schonlau Kaneko. Jeff Schlanger: [Exhibition] March 17-April 23, 2005. New York, N.Y.: CUE Art Foundation, 2005. OCLC 173389777
  - Exhibition catalog; curated by Ree Schonlau Kaneko.

== See also ==
- Culture in Omaha
