= John Beasley (actor) =

American actor (1943–2023)

- Born: June 26, 1943; Omaha, Nebraska, U.S.
- Died: May 30, 2023 (aged 79); Omaha, Nebraska, U.S.
- Occupation: Actor
- Years active: 1989–2022
- Spouse: Judy Beasley (m. 1965)
- Children: 2
- Relatives: Malik Beasley (grandson)

John Beasley (June 26, 1943 – May 30, 2023) was an American actor. He is best known for the films Rudy (1993), The Apostle (1997), The Sum of All Fears (2002), Walking Tall (2004), The Purge: Anarchy (2014), and Sinister 2 (2015), and as Irv Harper in the TV series Everwood (2002–2006). In 2002, Beasley founded the "John Beasley Theater & Workshop" in Omaha, Nebraska, to promote live theater, especially works written by or featuring African Americans.

== Life and career ==
Beasley was born in Omaha, Nebraska, on June 26, 1943. He did not begin his acting career until his mid-40s. Prior to that he was a railroad man with the Union Pacific Railroad. He established the John Beasley Theater and Workshop in South Omaha, and he would remain working there for nearly a dozen years.

Beasley played General Lasseter in The Sum of All Fears and Reverend C. Charles Blackwell in The Apostle. In 1992, he played Jesse and Terry Hall's father in The Mighty Ducks. He starred in the 2004 remake of Walking Tall.

Beasley made numerous guest roles on television and has appeared in several television films. His most prominent role in a television series was as Irv Harper in the WB series Everwood. He also appeared in the TV Land sitcom The Soul Man, which aired its fifth and final season in 2016. Beasley also claimed that even if he had not made it to Broadway, he still would have had a successful career.

== Personal life and death ==
Beasley married Judy Beasley, and would remain her husband for nearly sixty years, until his death. They had two sons and six grandchildren. His grandson Malik is a professional basketball player for the Santurce Crabbers.

Beasley died at a hospital in Omaha on May 30, 2023, at the age of 79. He was buried at Forest Lawn Memorial Park.

== Filmography ==
=== Film ===
Year	Title	Role	Notes
1991	V.I. Warshawski	Ernie	
1992	The Mighty Ducks	Mr. Hall	
1993	Rudy	Coach Warren	
1993	Untamed Heart	Cook	
1994	Little Big League	Roberts	
1997	The Apostle	Brother C. Charles Blackwell	
1999	The General's Daughter	Col. Slesinger	
1999	Crazy in Alabama	Nehemiah Jackson	
2000	The Operator	Rev. James	
2000	Lost Souls	Mike Smythe	
2000	The Gift	Albert Hawkins	
2002	The Sum of All Fears	Gen. Lasseter	
2004	Walking Tall	Chris Vaughn Sr.	
2014	The Purge: Anarchy	Papa Rico Sanchez	
2015	I'll See You in My Dreams	Mike	
2015	Sinister 2	Father Rodriguez	
2019	The Turkey Bowl	Judge Tibbins	
2020	Cowboys	Ben the Friendly Ranger	
2020	Spell	Earl	
2022	Firestarter	Irv Manders	

=== Television ===
Year	Title	Role	Notes
1990	Brewster Place	Mr. Willie	Episodes: "Open for Business", "Spring Fever", "Whatever Happened to Patience Jones", "Bernice Sands Comes Home"
1993	Laurel Avenue	Mr. Coleman	TV miniseries
1994	Roseanne	Reggie	Episode: "Two for One"
1997	To Sir, with Love II	Ogden	Episode: "Pilot"
1998	Early Edition	Capt. Leon Haines	Episodes: "A Minor Miracle", "The Quality of Mercy"
1999	Millennium	James Edward Hollis	Episodes: "Darwin's Eye", "Via Dolorosa", "Goodbye to All That"
1999	A.T.F.	Sec. Robert Edward	TV film
2000	Freedom Song	Jonah Summer	TV film
2000	Disappearing Acts	Mr. Banks	TV film
2000, 2003	Judging Amy	Judge Henry Bromell	Episodes: "Dog Days", "Shock and Awe", "Kilt Trip"
2000–2001	CSI: Crime Scene Investigation	Charles Moore	Episodes: "Crate 'n' Burial", "Evaluation Day"
2002–2006	Everwood	Irv Harper	Main role
2006	The Lost Room	Gus	Episode: "The Comb and the Box"
2007	NCIS	Daryl Hardy	Episode: "Suspicion"
2007	Boston Legal	Det. Walter McKay	Episode: "The Chicken and the Leg"
2009	Chasing a Dream	Peter Boscow	TV film
2010	CSI: Miami	Henry Dawson	Episode: "Backfire"
2011	Harry's Law	Judge Ronald Winston	Episode: "Pilot"
2011	Detroit 1-8-7	Joe King	Episode: "Beaten/Cover Letter"
2011	Treme	Don Encalade	Episodes: "Carnival Time", "Can I Change My Mind?", What Is New Orleans?", "Do Watcha Wanna"
2012–2016	The Soul Man	Barton Ballentine	Main role (season 1), recurring (seasons 2–5)
2017	The Immortal Life of Henrietta Lacks	Cliff	TV film
2017	Shots Fired	Mr. Dabney	Recurring role
2018	The Resident	Mortimer Rosenthal	Episode: "Comrades in Arms"
2019	Limetown	The Reverend	Episodes: "Rake", "Napoleon"
2019	The Mandalorian	Bartender	Episode: "Chapter One"
2021	Your Honor	Elijah Davies	Episode: "Part Ten"

== See also ==
- Theatre in Omaha
