= Bluebarn Theatre =

Theater in Omaha, Nebraska, United States

Coordinates: 41°15′14″N 95°55′51″W

The Bluebarn Theatre, located at 1106 S. 10th Street in Omaha, Nebraska, United States, is a nationally recognized theater.

Begun in 1989, the theater was founded by a group of 1988 graduates from the theater program at Purchase College: Kevin Lawler, Hughston Walkinshaw, Nils Haaland and Mary Theresa Green.

The theater was started at the invitation of the Bemis Center for Contemporary Arts, with whom the theater initially shared a space. In 2015 the theater built its own 96-seat theater with an indoor/outdoor performance space.

The Bluebarn produces the works of contemporary American playwrights as well as original works. Omaha-born filmmaker Alexander Payne, who has been a longtime supporter of the theater, volunteered to be interviewed on the stage in 2002 for a fundraising event for the Bluebarn by Hughston Walkinshaw and current Artistic Director Susan Clement-Toberer.

== See also ==
- Theatre in Omaha
