= Bemis Center for Contemporary Arts =

- Established: 1981
- Location: Omaha, Nebraska
- Coordinates: 41°15′09″N 95°55′57″W
- Type: Art museum Artist cooperative
- Website: bemiscenter.org

Bemis Center for Contemporary Arts is located in the Old Market Historic District of downtown Omaha, Nebraska, at the corner of 12th Street and Leavenworth Street. In addition to an international artist-in-residence program, Bemis Center hosts temporary exhibitions and commissions and public programs which are free and open to the public.

== History ==
Bemis Center for Contemporary Arts was founded by artists Jun Kaneko, Tony Hepburn, Lorne Falke and Ree Schonlau in 1981. In 1984, Ree Schonlau established a consortium consisting of the City of Omaha, the United States Department of Housing and Urban Development, private and corporate foundations and the Mercer family, who owned the vacant 170,000-square-foot (16,000 m^{2}) Bemis Bag Building. The structure had originally been built as a branch of the Nave & McCord Mercantile Company.

=== Locations ===
Bemis Center for Contemporary Arts was formerly located at the Bemis Omaha Bag Company Building, 614 South 11th Street, which was severely damaged in a fire in 1999.

Today, Bemis Center for Contemporary Arts is located in the old McCord-Brady & Co. building on 12th and Leavenworth.

== See also ==
- Culture in Omaha
- The Old Market
