= Dundee Dell =

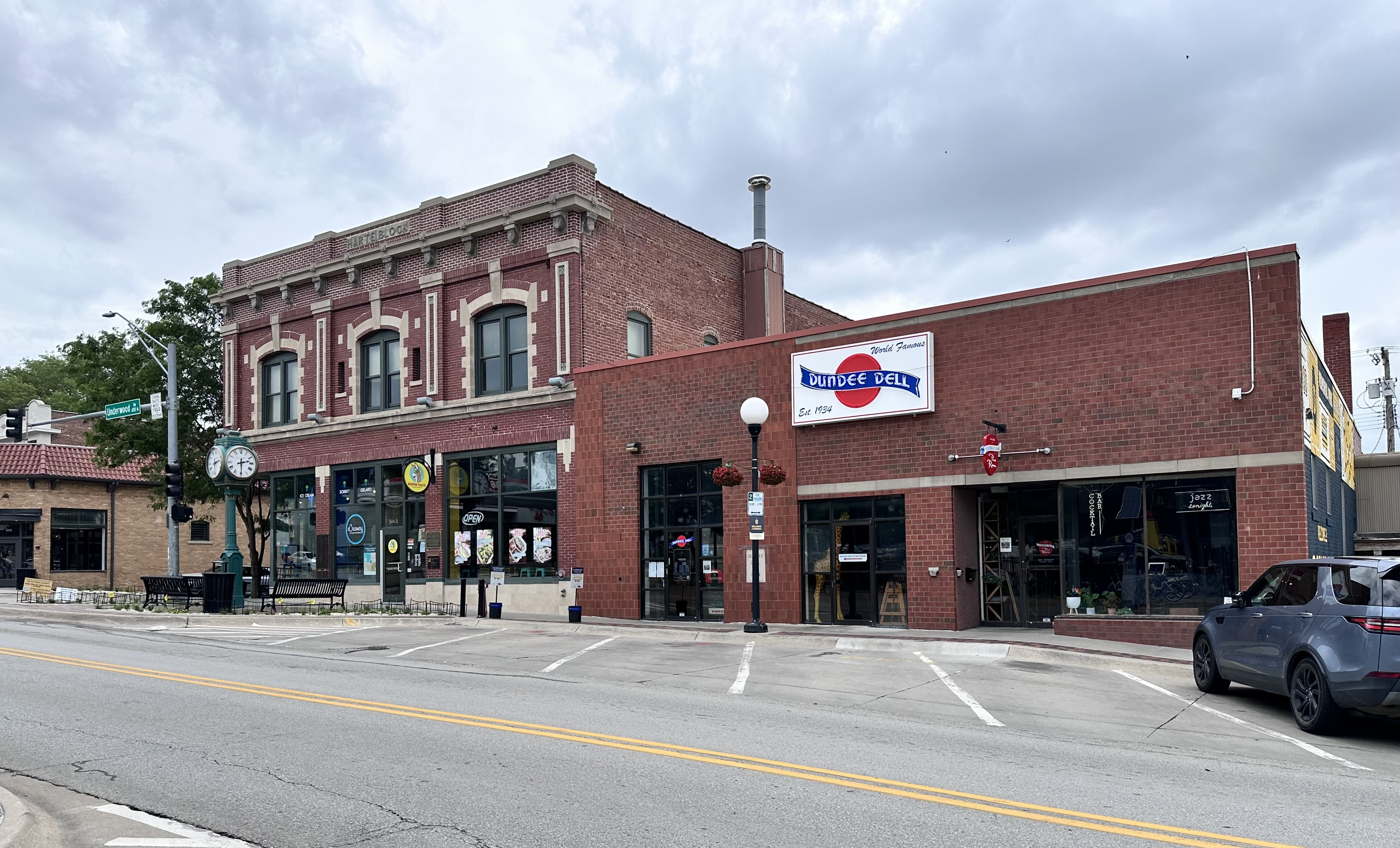
- Interactive map of Dundee Dell

Restaurant information
- Established: 1920
- Location: 5007 Underwood Avenue, Omaha, NE, 68132
- Coordinates: 41.26499°N 95.99080°W
- Website: Official website

The Dundee Dell (originally known as the Dundee Delicatessen) is a restaurant bar in the Dundee area of Omaha, Nebraska. It is perhaps best known for its homemade fish and chips and collection of single malt Scotch whisky, credited to being one of the largest in the United States. It also carries an extensive beer selection, including some fourteen varieties on tap and several hundred in bottles.

The restaurant began as a delicatessen in a one-car garage near 50th Street and Dodge Street in 1920. In 1934, after being granted a liquor license, the deli opened as a restaurant and was renamed Dundee Dell. It was relocated at the intersection between 50th Street and Underwood Avenue in 2000. The place bills itself as a neighborhood pub, and has decorated its walls with memorabilia from various British and Irish beer and liquor companies, particularly Guinness.

The restaurant's parking lot and exterior is briefly featured in the 1999 film Election.

In July 2020, the restaurant owners announced its closure due to a lack of business from the coronavirus pandemic.

== See also ==
- Culture in Omaha, Nebraska
