= American Midwest Ballet =

American ballet company

American Midwest Ballet is a dance company in Council Bluffs, Iowa. In 2019, American Midwest Ballet was moved to downtown Council Bluffs.

Company repertoire includes an annual production of The Nutcracker featuring local student dancers.
