= Omaha Community Playhouse =

Theater in Omaha, Nebraska, United States

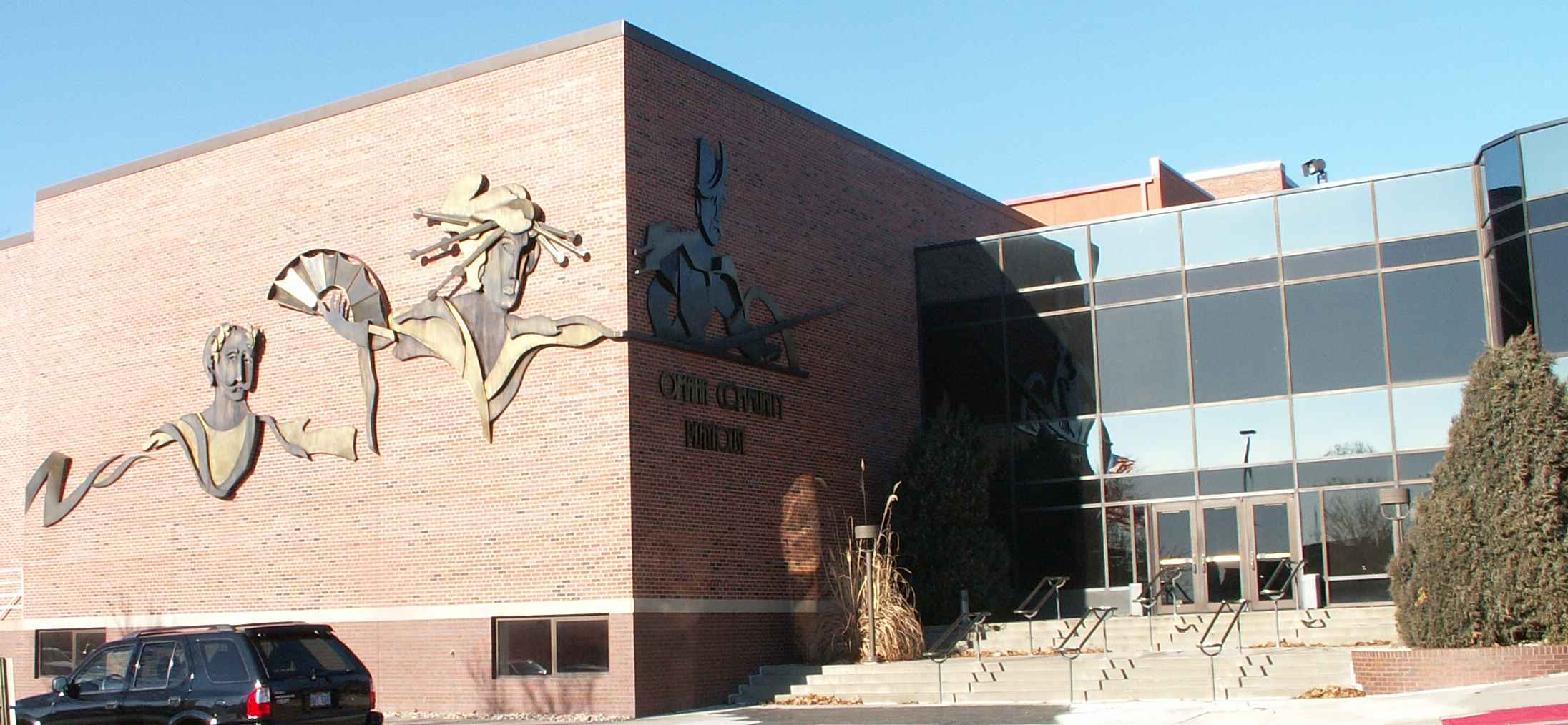
- Interactive map of Omaha Community Playhouse
- Address: 6915 Cass Street; Omaha, Nebraska; United States
- Coordinates: 41.263937°N 96.020336°W

Website
- omahaplayhouse.com

The Omaha Community Playhouse, located at 6915 Cass Street in Omaha, Nebraska, United States, is a nationally recognized community theater.

Founded in 1924, the Playhouse's first president was Alan McDonald, architect of the Joslyn Art Museum, and its first play, directed by Greg Foley in April 1925, was The Enchanted Cottage, which starred Dodie Brando, the mother of Marlon Brando.

When, later in the Playhouse's first season, the need arose for a young man to play the lead for You and I, Dodie Brando suggested that twenty-year-old Henry Fonda, son of her friend Herberta Fonda, contact the director. The Playhouse would later see the acting debut of Marlon Brando, Dorothy McGuire, and Julie Wilson, and appearances by Letitia Baldrige, Glenn Cunningham, and Lenka Peterson.

The Nebraska Theatre Caravan, the playhouse's touring unit, was founded in 1976.

The Playhouse experienced tremendous growth throughout the 1980s and 1990s under the direction of Charles Jones.

== See also ==
- Theatre in Omaha
