= Mister C's =

Italian restaurant in North Omaha, Nebraska

Coordinates: 41°18′27″N 95°57′22″W

Mister C's Steakhouse
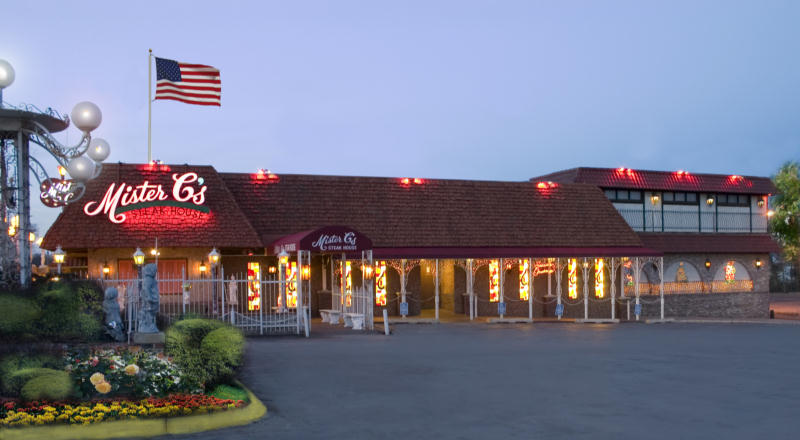
- Mister C's front entrance on N. 30th St.
- Interactive map of Mister C's Steakhouse

Restaurant information
- Established: 1953
- Owners: Yano and Mary Caniglia
- Food type: Southern Italian
- Location: 5319 North 30th Street, Omaha, Nebraska, 68111, USA
- Other information: Closed in 2007
- Website: www.mistercs.com

Mister C's Steak House was a landmark Italian restaurant located at 5319 North 30th Street in North Omaha, Nebraska. After operating for almost 55 years, the restaurant closed September 30, 2007. The mayor of Omaha and Omaha City Council declared September 18, 2007, "Mister C and Mary Caniglia Day" in honor of the owners' service to the city through the restaurant. The North Omaha Commercial Club also honored them.

== History ==
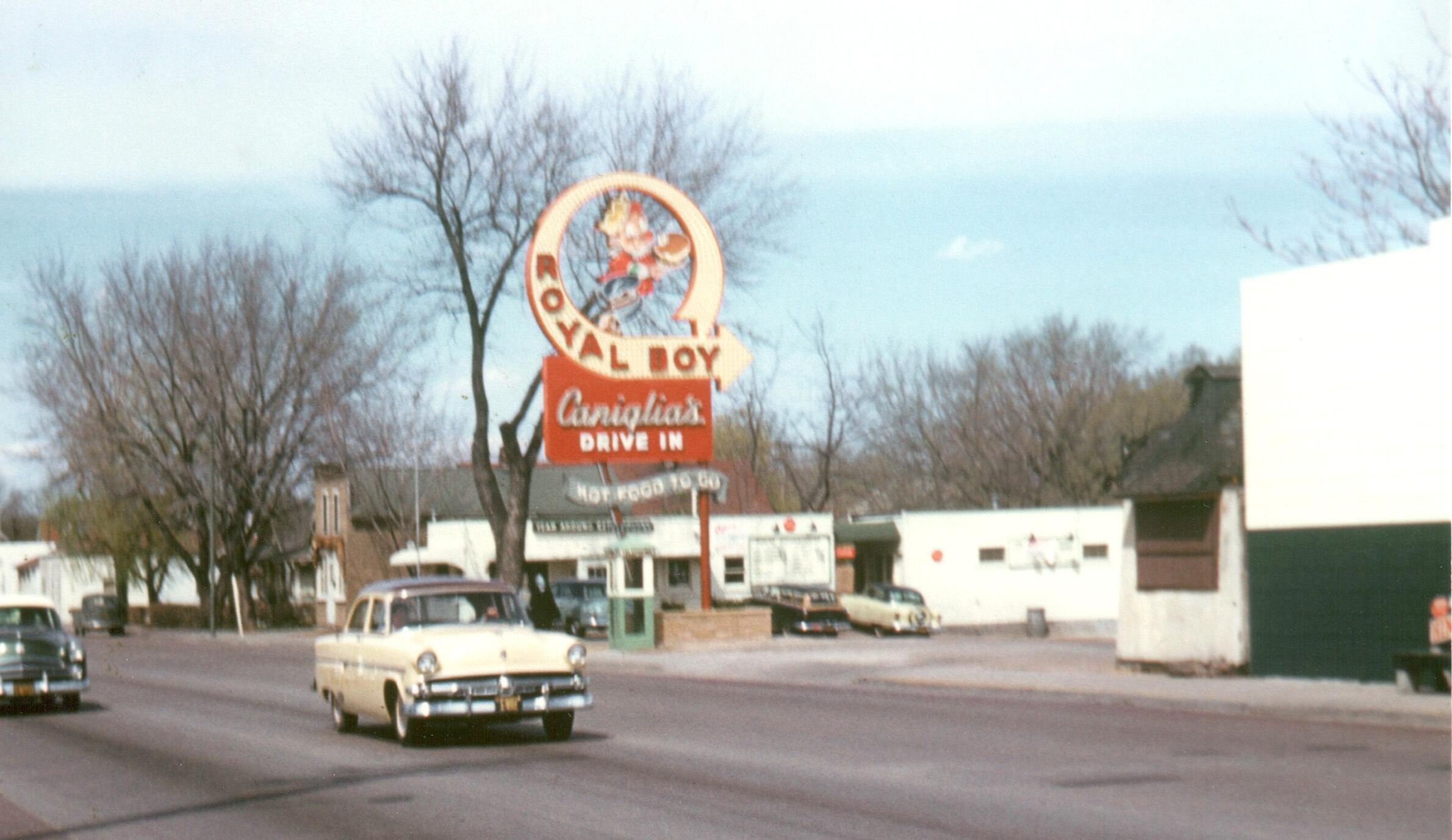
1953 Royal Boy Drive In

Sebastiano "Yano" Caniglia's family came to Little Italy, south of downtown Omaha, Nebraska, from Carlentini, Sicily, in the early 1900s. In 1946, after working in the family bakery for several years, Caniglia pooled his money together with his four brothers to transform the family bakery business into Caniglia's Pizzeria. In 1953 Sebastiano Caniglia left the family business to buy a drive-in in North Omaha. It was called Caniglia's Royal Boy Drive-In, but Caniglia started adding sit-down seating in the 1950s and closed the drive-in portion in 1970. In 1971 he renamed the restaurant "Mister C's", which became his nickname, too. It was always a family partnership, with his wife Mary and their children, Larry, Tom, and David who all worked in the restaurant at one time.

The other Caniglia brothers went on to open several successful restaurants, as well. Ventures included a range of styles and price points, from the Palazzo Italiano at 84th and West Center, Lou Caniglia’s Steak House & Little Luigi’s Tower of Pizza at 88th and Maple, to "The Top of The World" at the Woodmen Tower and Piccolo Pete’s Restaurant on South 20th Street. In 1988 Mister C's was cited by an industry magazine as one of the USA's leading independent restaurants within its income bracket of $6 to $7 million in annual sales.

The restaurant and its owners were widely regarded as important contributors to the local community; it was a gathering place for students and their families from Omaha North High School, a place of weddings and parties. Mary Caniglia said that Mister C's would close in the fall of 2007, and that she and her husband would retire then.

== Food and environment ==
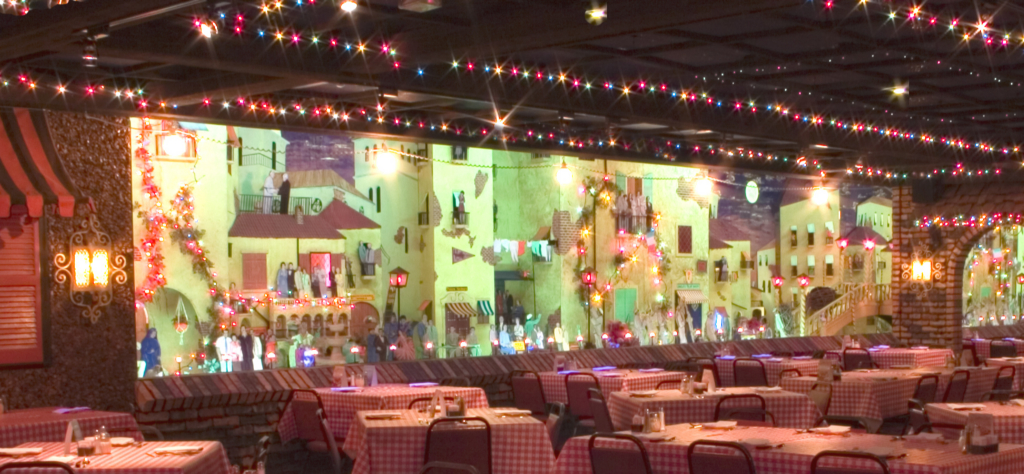

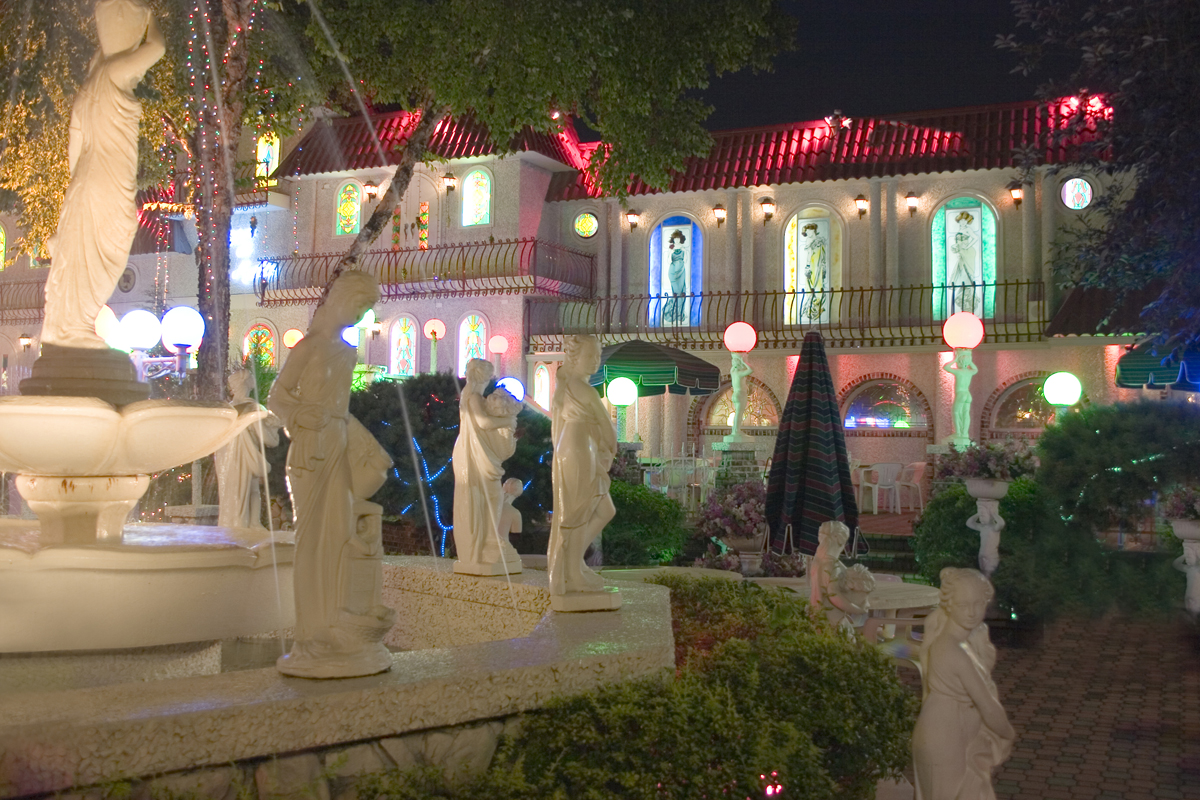
Piazza di Maria

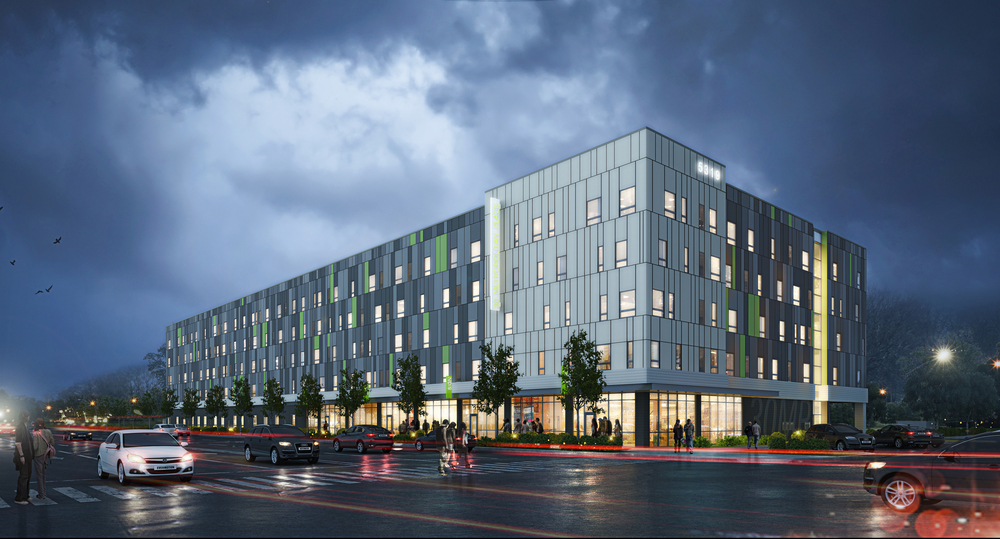
30 Metro

Described as a "required place to visit" in Omaha by the Fort Worth Star-Telegram, the restaurant was regarded highly for its Italian cuisine and ambiance. Features of the restaurant included holiday lights throughout the main dining area, a 3-D panorama (that now resides at The Durham Museum) featuring local notables and the Piazza di Maria an outdoor Italian themed courtyard. Many items were made available for public purchase before the building would be razed. Mister C's property was purchased by White Lotus Group in 2013. A new five-story, 113,000-square-foot mixed-use building called "30 Metro" now stands in place of the beloved Mister C's restaurant. 30 Metro features 110 affordable apartment units, a Charles Drew health clinic, a T-Mobile and there is still 3,000 square feet of commercial space available.

== Current ==
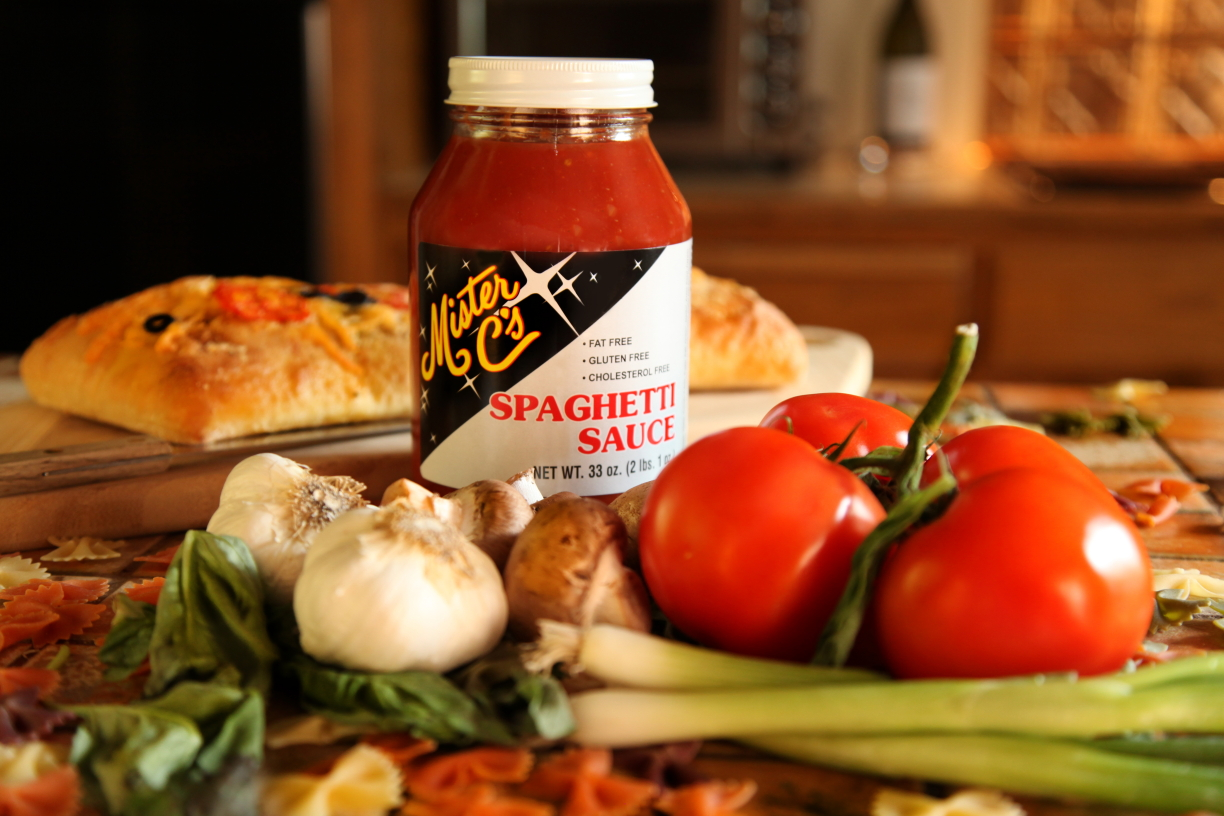
Mister C's spaghetti sauce 33 ounces

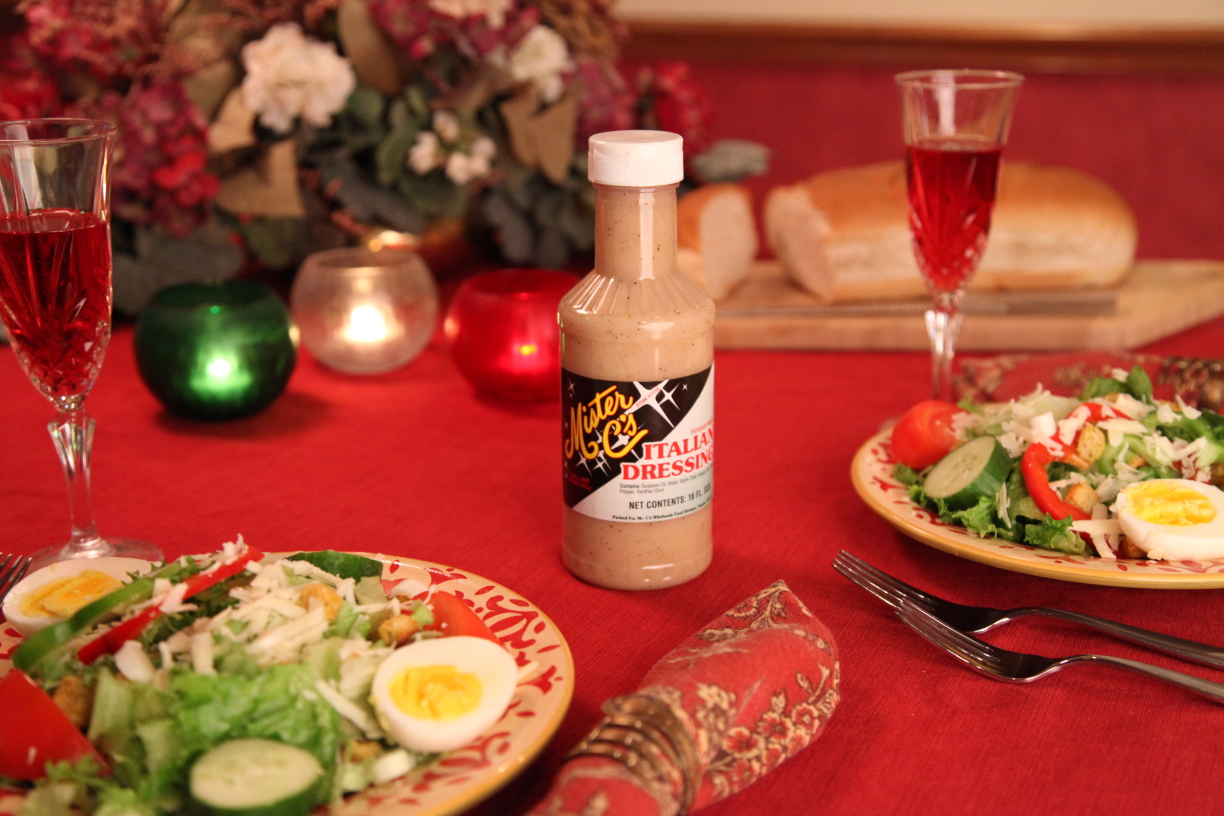
Mister C's Italian Dressing, 16 ounce

From 1988 to present Mister C's has produced its famous spaghetti sauce and Italian dressing, dba Mister C’s Wholesale Foods Incorporated.

== See also ==
- Cuisine in Omaha
- List of Italian restaurants
