= Gorat's =

Coordinates: 41.2413°N 95.9886°W

Gorat's Steak House
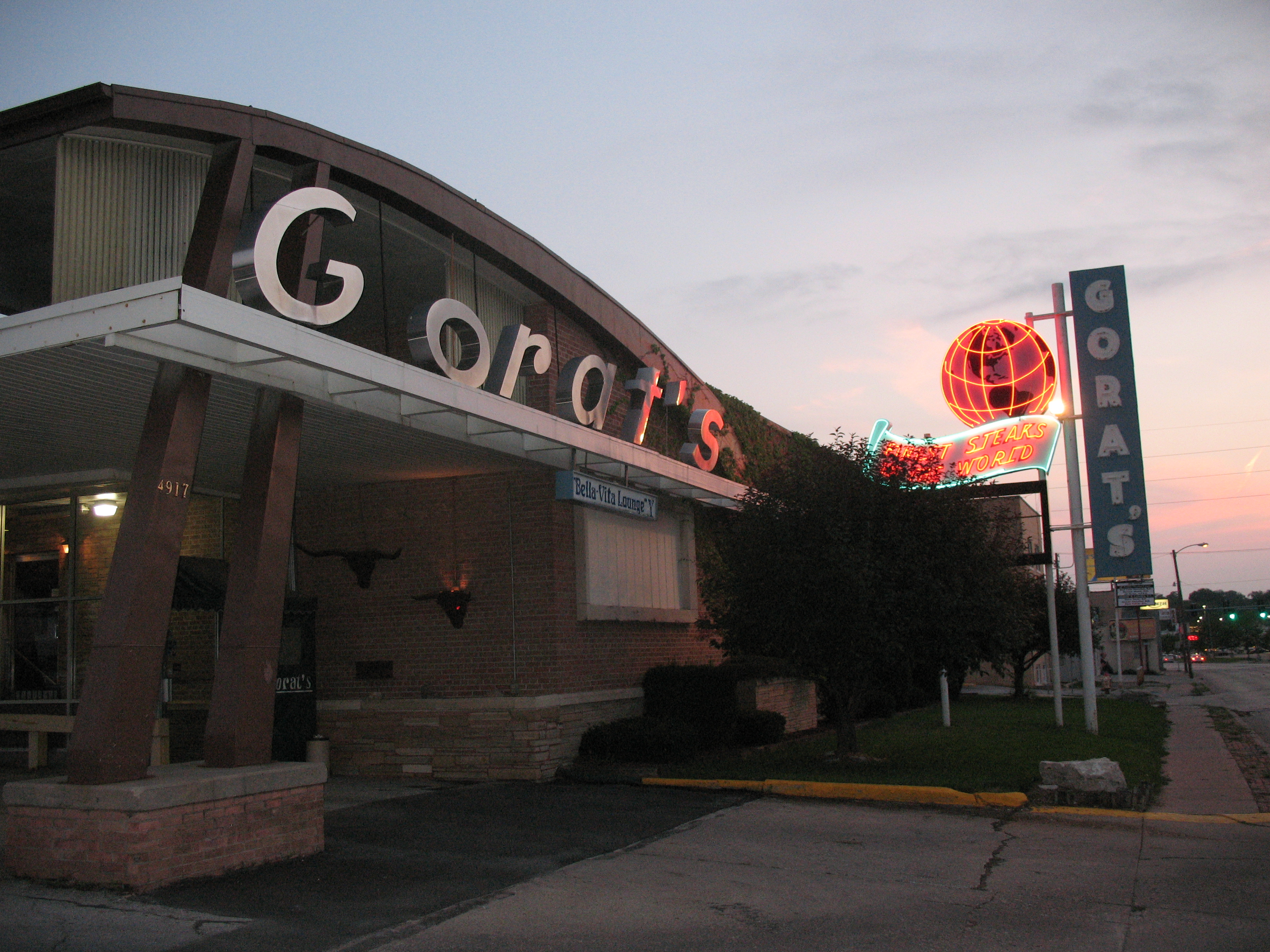
- Interactive map of Gorat's Steak House

Restaurant information
- Established: 1944; 82 years ago
- Location: 4917 Center Street, Omaha, Nebraska, USA
- Website: www.goratsomaha.com

Gorat's Steak House is a restaurant in Omaha, Nebraska, at 4917 Center Street.

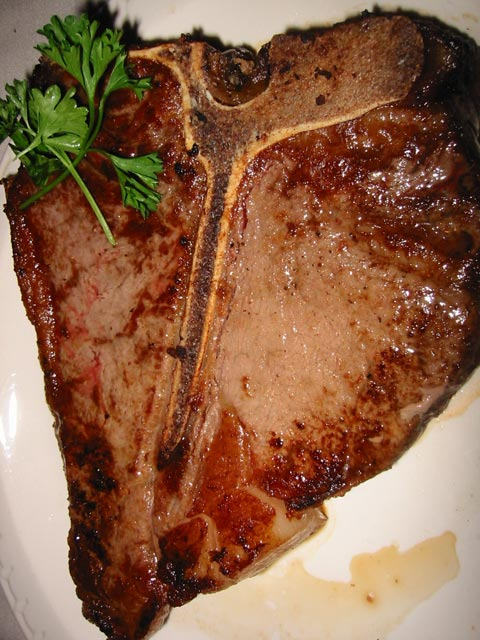
A griddle-cooked T-bone steak at Gorat's

It is best known as billionaire Warren Buffett's favorite steakhouse, where he annually holds dinners for the largest investors in his company, Berkshire Hathaway, and entertains business colleagues and CEOs, including Michael Eisner, Bill Gates, and Martha Stewart.

Gorat's was founded in 1944 by Louis and Nettie Gorat. It has been one of Omaha's most famous restaurants for the past 60 years. Gorat's is a traditional-style Italian steakhouse which serves pasta dishes, seafood, and chicken, as well as steak. Gene Dunn purchased the restaurant in 2012, and renovated it for 1950s decor. The house specialty is the T-bone steak, which is favored by Buffett, who orders it cooked rare, with a double order of hash browns and a Cherry Coke.

There is dancing and live entertainment on Thursdays, Fridays and Saturdays.
