= Shelterbelt Theatre =

The Shelterbelt Theatre is a nonprofit theater organization located in Midtown Omaha, Nebraska that specializes in producing original works for the stage. The theatre won best musical and nine more awards at the 2007 Omaha Metropolitan Area Theatre Arts Guild Awards, and won several categories in the 2007 Omaha World-Herald Entertainment and Arts Awards.

== About ==
The Shelterbelt Theatre is a nonprofit theater organization specializing in producing original works for the stage. While it was previously known for its intimate setting at 33rd and California Streets, The Shelterbelt and sister theatre Snap!Productions have recently lost their home, bringing an end to Omaha's last storefront theater.

== History ==
In 1993 an Omaha playwright named Scott Working brought a script, V OF GEESE, into a local coffee shop and lounge called Kilgore's. After performing the play there Working, along with Alicia McGarr, L. Scott Blankenship, and Ken Jacobs founded the Shelterbelt Theatre in 1993.

Named after the farming practice of planting a windbreak, a long row trees to protect the farmer's homestead and family, the four founding members wanted a place where artists could take refuge in a healthy, unrestricted environment.

== Productions ==
Currently the Shelterbelt Theatre presents 4 regular shows per season and presents or participates in a variety of other events. Hallmarks of the theatre's regular schedule include the annual productions "From Shelterbelt With Love" (tales of love and relationships) and "Shelterskelter," (tales of horror, the macabre, suspense and dark comedy) coinciding with Valentine's Day and Halloween respectively. These shows are known for their vignette style production as well as their high-energy performances. In addition, the Shelterbelt produces two other productions, which have included original musicals, original plays, and other more experimental theatre productions. Non-regular season performances include the Instant Theater Festival, a 24-hour festival in which plays are written, rehearsed, and performed all in a single day, the Great Plains Theatre Conference, and "Christmas with the Crawfords" in partnership with the Shelterbelt's sister company, SNAP! Productions.
