= Jun Kaneko =

Japanese-American ceramic sculptor (born 1942)

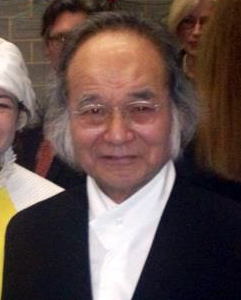
- Kaneko in Charlotte, North Carolina on January 19, 2013
- Born: July 1942 (age 84); Nagoya, Japan
- Awards: Honorary Doctorate from the Royal College of Art in London
- Website: www.junkaneko.com

Four Dango by Kaneko, all 2001, Honolulu Museum of Art

Jun Kaneko (金子 潤, Kaneko Jun; born 1942) is a Japanese-born American ceramic artist known for creating large scale ceramic sculpture. Based out of a studio warehouse in Omaha, Nebraska, Kaneko primarily works in clay to explore the effects of repeated abstract surface motifs by using ceramic glaze.

== Early life and education ==
In 1942 he was born in Nagoya, Japan, where he studied painting in high school. He came to the United States in 1963 to continue those studies at Chouinard Art Institute in Los Angeles when his focus was drawn to sculptural ceramics through his introduction to Fred Marer. He studied with Peter Voulkos, Paul Soldner, and Jerry Rothman in California during the time now defined as the contemporary ceramics movement.

== Career ==
The following decade, Kaneko taught at various U.S. art schools, including Scripps College, Cranbrook Academy of Art and Rhode Island School of Design.

Kaneko established his third studio in Omaha, Nebraska, in 1990 where he primarily works. He has also created work in several experimental studios including European Ceramic Work Center, Otsuka Omi Ceramic Company, Fabric Workshop, Bullseye Glass Co., and A.S.A.P. He created series of large-scale sculptures from 1982 to 1983 at his Omaha Project, from 1992 to 1994 at his Fremont Project in California and currently at his Mission Clay Project in Kansas. He produced a large Dango series of ceramic pieces resembling vases without openings. (Dango means "dumpling" or "closed form" in Japanese.) The Honolulu Museum of Art has four of these dango permanently installed in a courtyard. His prolific roster of diverse work appears in numerous international solo and group exhibitions annually.

Kaneko's technique involves the use of masking tape and colored slips, which he uses to cover free-standing ceramic forms and wall-hung pieces with graphic motifs and markings. He frequently favors the large oval plate as one of his sculptural formats, which serves as a canvas for arrangements of straight, curving, and spiraling lines, creating an interplay of abstract imagery on a three-dimensional surface.

He also designed sets and costumes for opera performances: Opera Omaha's Madama Butterfly (2006) and a co production of the San Francisco Opera, Opera Omaha, Opera Carolina and the Washington National Opera, The Magic Flute (2012).

His work is included in more than forty museum collections including the Hawaii State Art Museum, the Honolulu Museum of Art, the Los Angeles County Museum of Art, the Museum of Arts and Design (New York City), the Museum of Nebraska Art, the Sheldon Museum of Art, the Philadelphia Museum of Art, Scripps College, the Shigaraki Ceramics Museum (Shigaraki, Japan), and the Smithsonian American Art Museum. His most recent collected works is Water Plaza at Bartle Hall in Kansas City, Missouri. Kaneko has realized over twenty-five public art commissions around the world. He has been honored with national, state and organization fellowships and an honorary doctorate from the Royal College of Art in London.

== Major permanent commissions ==
- Polka Dot Sidewalk, 1984, Museum of South Texas History, Edinburg, Texas
- Salt Palace, 1994, Salt Lake City
- Tropical Sounds, 2000, public art sculpture installation in front of Waikiki Aquarium, Honolulu, Hawaii
- Untitled, 2000, Hawaii State Art Museum Sculpture Garden
- Dango, 2001, Honolulu Museum of Art
- Primary Vision, 2011, Cedar Rapids Museum of Art
- Garden of Tanukis, 2014, Henry Doorly Zoo and Aquarium, Omaha, Nebraska
- Ascent, 2014, Lincoln Community Foundation, Lincoln, Nebraska

== Sources ==
- Chang, Gordon H., Mark Dean Johnson, Paul J. Karlstrom & Sharon Spain, Asian American Art, a History, 1850–1970, Stanford University Press, ISBN 9780804757515, pp. 346–347
- Honolulu Museum of Art, Spalding House Self-guided Tour, Sculpture Garden, 2014, p. 3
- Kaneko, Jun, “Jun Kaneko, selected works, 1989-2005, edited by Iwai Mieko”, Osaka, Japan, Kokuritsu Kokusai Bijutsukan, 2005.
- Morse, Marcia and Allison Wong, 10 Years: The Contemporary Museum at First Hawaiian Center, The Contemporary Museum, Honolulu, 2006, ISBN 1888254076, p. 56
- Peterson, Susan, “Jun Kaneko / Susan Peterson, foreword by Arthur C. Danto”, London, Laurence King, 2001.
