= Tikkun olam =

Concept in Judaism

Tikkun olam (/tiˈkuːn ʌˈlɑːm/, or more classically tikkun ha'olam; Hebrew: תִּיקּוּן עוֹלָם, romanized: tiqqūn ʻōlām, lit. 'repairing the world'), is a religious concept in Judaism, which refers to various forms of action intended to repair and improve the world.

In classical rabbinic literature, the phrase referred to legal enactments intended to preserve the social order. In the Aleinu, it refers to the eradication of idolatry. In midrash, it often refers to divine action to balance and sustain the world, especially in relationship to Nature. In Lurianic Kabbalah, the "repair" is mystical: to return the sparks of Divine light to their source, employing ritual performance. However, it is only much later in Kabbalah that this concept is applied to tikkun olam, rather than to the repair of a particular world or sefirah among the infinitely many worlds beyond the physical world. In the modern period, the Lurianic understanding of cosmic repair provided a mythos to inspire deep religious feelings about tikkun olam.

In the modern era, particularly among the post-Haskalah movements, tikkun ha'olam has come to refer to the pursuit of social justice, or "the establishment of Godly qualities throughout the world", based on the idea that "Jews bear responsibility not only for their own moral, spiritual, and material welfare, but also for the welfare of society at large". This understanding of tikkun olam has deep roots in midrash, musar, and Jewish thought that connect tikkun ha'olam to building society, loving one's neighbors, and to religious humanism in general.

== History ==
=== In the Mishnah ===
The earliest use of the term tikkun ha'olam appears in the Mishnah in the phrase "for the sake of repairing the world" (Hebrew: מִפְּנֵי תִקּוּן הָעוֹלָם, lit. 'mippənē t̲iqqun hāʿolām', Gittin 4:2–9), with the meaning of amending the law to keep society well-functioning.

Several legal enactments appear in this passage, with "for the sake of repairing the world" given as justification:

- One cannot convene a court in another place to nullify a get (divorce document). (4:2)
- One must fully specify the names of the husband and wife on a divorce document. (4:2)
- A widow can collect her ketubah even without a formal oath. (4:3)
- Witnesses must sign the divorce document. (4:3)
- Prozbul was instituted. (4:3)
- If an enslaver set aside an enslaved person as a designated repayment for his debts, the enslaved person is freed, but the responsibility to repay the debt is transferred to them. (4:4)
- If two people enslave one person, and one enslaver frees that person, the formerly enslaved person is forced to repay the second enslaver his share of the value of the enslavement. (4:5)
- Captives are not redeemed for more than their monetary value. (4:6)
- Captives are not aided in their attempts to escape (so that captors do not make the conditions of captivity more restrictive, or else so that captors do not take revenge on other captives). (4:6)
- Torah scrolls, tefillin, and mezuzot are not purchased from non-Jews for more than their value. (4:6)
- When a husband made a vow requiring him to divorce his wife, they were then allowed to remarry. (4:7)
- One who sold their field to a Gentile must purchase and bring the first fruits from that field. (4:9)

More generally, tikkun can mean improvement, establishment, repair, preparation, and other related concepts. In the Mishnaic context, it generally refers to practical legal measures taken in the present to ameliorate social conditions. In the legal language of the Talmud, however, the verb took on a much more legalistic role, in that a takkana "affixation" was a category of legal enactment made by the Chazal.

=== In Aleinu ===
A conception of tikkun olam is also found in the Aleinu, a concluding part of most Jewish congregational prayer, which, in contrast to the Mishnah's usage, focuses on the end of time. The Aleinu beseeches God:

לראות מהרה בתפארת עוזך, להעביר גלולים מן הארץ והאלילים כרות יכרתון לתקן עולם במלכות ש-די

Translation:

to speedily see Your mighty splendor, to cause detestable (idolatry) to be removed from the land, and the (false) gods will be utterly "cut off", to takein olam – fix/repair/establish a world – under the Almighty's kingdom

In other words, when all the people of the world abandon false gods, and recognize God, the world will have been perfected. The eschatological idea that tikkun olam is a process that ends in redemption is rooted in this element of Aleinu.

Among modern liberal Jewish movements, a common, but more modern, understanding of this phrase is that we share a partnership with God, and are instructed to take the steps towards improving the state of the world, and helping others, which simultaneously brings more honor to God's sovereignty.

Some scholars have argued that the Aleinu prayer is actually not a valid source for the concept of tikkun olam, claiming that the original prayer used a homonym "l'takhen" (spelled differently, לתכן), meaning "to establish" (rather than "to fix", or "to repair"); this wording is still used by Yemenite Jews. However, among European Jews, Aleinu has used the word "to fix" (לתקן) since at least the first recorded texts in the 11th–12th centuries. Thus, Aleinu's influence on the concept of tikkun olam can date to at least this time.

=== Maimonides ===
Over the course of Jewish intellectual history, tikkun ha'olam has at times referred to eschatological concerns, as in Aleinu, and at times to practical concerns, as in the Mishnah, but in either context, it refers to some kind of social change or process that is for the betterment of Jews or Gentiles, or the world. Whether that happens primarily within Jewish society, or primarily in relation to the nations of the world, whether that happens primarily through acts of justice and kindness, or equally through ritual observance, whether primarily through internal work of an individual or through external deeds, is something that changes from one source to the next.

For example, Talmudic scholar and eminent philosopher Maimonides saw tikkun ha'olam as fully inclusive of all these dimensions when he wrote: "Through wisdom, which is [represented by] Torah, and the elevation of character, which is [represented by] acts of kindness, and observing the Torah's commandments, which are [represented by] the sacrifices, one continuously brings tikkun ha'olam improvement of the world, and the ordering of reality." Yet, he also saw justice as the fundamental component, as, for example, when he wrote, "Every judge who judges truth unto its [deepest] truth, even for one hour, it's as if he fixed the whole world entirely / tikein et kol ha'olam kulo and caused the Shekhinah to rest upon Israel."

=== Jewish Social Thought ===
An emphasis on universal or humanistic ethical principles in relation to tikkun ha'olam is also found in the social thought of Jewish philosophers and ethical thinkers through the centuries. Though this tradition was more of an unconscious influence on modern ideas about tikkun olam, since these sources were less known, it demonstrates that the so-called liberal interpretations of tikkun ha'olam have deep historical roots. The following examples are all quoted in translation from "The History and Evolution of Tikkun Olam":

Tanna deVei Eliyahu: "‘Don’t oppress your neighbor and don’t steal’— your neighbor behold is like your brother, and your brother is like your neighbor, so you have learned that stealing from an idolater is forbidden."

Bachya ibn Pakuda: "one’s involvement with people in establishing the world, from plowing and harvest [to] buying and selling and [such] matters through which some people are helped by some [others] in [the process of] settling the world — [namely,] that one should love for them [to receive] what one would love for oneself from them, and ...have compassion for them, and according to one’s ability [one should] push away from them whatever would harm them, as it’s written (Lev. 19:18), 'And you will love your neighbor like yourself.'"

Pinchas Hurwitz: "The essence of loving neighbors is that a person would love all humanity, being from whatever people they are from and from whatever language they speak, for each is a person in [God’s] image and in [God’s] likeness like oneself, and engaged in settling the world . . . for by means of these things the world is established according to its proper order / ha’olam omeid k’tikuno..."

By the time of Natan Friedland, an early Zionist thinker, a full-blown progressive interpretation (as modern society would understand it) was well-formed:

"Neighbor" is what someone is called who joins themself with you in nearness of spirit/consciousness and in humanistic values, who will be whomever they will be (i.e. from whatever race or tribe or country or religion)—[the] only [qualification is] that they should be in the category of lovers of humanity and the upright of heart, doing justice for the oppressed and engaging in the settling of the world / yishuvah shel olam... And this is the proper order for the redemption of the world / tikkun ha’olam: in the beginning, love of neighbor and peace, and from this one will come unto the truth, and from this one will come unto righteous justice, for the judges will find a world mended / olam m’tukan, and according to [the nature of] the world, so will be the laws.

=== Lurianic Kabbalah ===
Lurianic Kabbalah dwells on the role of prayer and ritual in the tikkun of the upper worlds. Though this is not the same as tikkun olam, these concepts had a huge impact on the development of ideas about tikkun olam about two centuries later, most notably, through the work of Moshe Chaim Luzzatto.

According to the Lurianic vision of the world, God contracted part of God's infinite light (Ohr Ein Sof) to create the world. The vessels of the first universe, the World of Chaos, shattered and their shards became sparks of light trapped within the next universe, the World of Rectification. Prayer, especially contemplation of various aspects of the divinity (sephirot), releases these sparks of God's light and allows them to reunite with God's essence. The "rectification" is two-fold: the gathering of light and of souls, to be achieved by human beings through the contemplative performance of religious acts. The goal of such repair, which can only be effected by humans, is to separate what is holy from the created world, thus depriving the physical world of its very existence, destroying the material universe. This restores all things to a world before disaster within the Godhead.

According to Moshe Chaim Luzzatto, in his book, Derech Hashem, the physical world is connected to spiritual realms above that influence the physical world, and Jews have the ability, through physical deeds and free will, to direct and control these spiritual forces. This exact definition of tikkun olam provided by Luzzatto is what people generally mean with they talk about tikkun olam in Kabbalah. God's desire in creating the world was that God's creations would ultimately recognize God's unity and overcome evil; this will constitute the perfection (tikkun) of creation. While Luzzatto understands this task to be strictly in the hands of the Jewish people now, other Kabbalists believe that the completion of rectification (g'mar hatikkun) will be when all of humanity will recognize and live by these truths.

=== Modern developments ===
==== Sourced in Kabbalah ====
In recent years, Jewish thinkers and activists have used Lurianic Kabbalah to elevate the full range of ethical and ritual mitzvot into acts of tikkun olam. The belief that not only does prayer lift divine sparks, but so do all of the mitzvot, including those traditionally understood as ethical, was already a part of Kabbalah. The contemporary emphasis serves the purpose of finding a mystical depth and spiritual energy in ethical mitzvot. The application of the Lurianic vision to improving the world can be seen in Jewish blogs, High Holiday sermons, and on-line Jewish learning resource centers.

The association between the Lurianic conception of tikkun and ethical action assigns an ultimate cosmic significance to even small acts of kindness and small improvements of social policy. However, this can be done in a manner that separates the concept of tikkun olam from its other meanings as found in rabbinic literature and the Aleinu prayer. That opens up the risk of privileging actions that represent personal agendas that may not fit with the norms of Judaism.

The application of Lurianic Kabbalah to ethical mitzvot and social action is particularly striking because Lurianic Kabbalah saw itself as repairing dimensions within the spiritual and mystical worlds, rather than this world and its social relations. Lurianic scholar Lawrence Fine points to two features of Lurianic Kabbalah that have made it adaptable to ethical mitzvot and social action. First, he points out that a generation recovering from the tragedy of the Holocaust resonates with the imagery of shattered vessels. Second, both Lurianic Kabbalah and ethical understandings of tikkun olam emphasize the role of human responsibility and action.

==== Sourced in Aleinu ====
The original context of the Aleinu prayer, in the Rosh Hashanah liturgy, is accompanied by the hope that "all [people/creatures] will form a single union to do Your will with a whole heart". In many contexts this is interpreted to be a call to universalism and justice for all mankind – sentiments which are common throughout Jewish liturgy.

For example, in the American Conservative movement's prayer book, Siddur Sim Shalom, "A Prayer for Our Country", elaborates on this passage: "May citizens of all races and creeds forge a common bond in true harmony to banish all hatred and bigotry" and "uniting all people in peace and freedom and helping them to fulfill the vision of your prophet: 'Nation shall not lift up sword against nation, neither shall they experience war anymore.'" Both lines express wholeheartedly the idea of universal equality, freedom, and peace for all.

In the liberal movements of Judaism, especially in the United States, this sentiment is embedded in the idea of acting compassionately for all people. For example, the 1975 New Union prayer book, used by the movement for Reform Judaism's Gates of Prayer, includes the text, "You [Lord] have taught us to uphold the falling, to heal the sick, to free the captive, to comfort all who suffer pain". These aspects of Judaism already have a traditional name however, gemilut chasadim, and some have criticized the emphasis on social action as disregard for other aspects of Judaism traditionally connected to tikkun olam, such as learning, prayer, repentance, and ritual commandments.

==== Sourced in Jewish Social Thought ====
Perhaps the most important Jewish thinker to use the phrase "tikkun olam" in the modern sense of "fixing the world" by building a just society was Rabbi Abraham Isaac Kook (1865–1935). Though he is sometimes seen as the first influencer and source for such ideas, in fact there are precedents going back to the 10th century.

According to Jewish scholar Lawrence Fine, the use of the phrase tikkun olam in modern Jewish history in the United States that most influenced its adoption as a framework for Jewish politics (and especially though not exclusively, into progressive or liberal politics) was by Brandeis-Bardin Camp Institute founder Shlomo Bardin in the 1950s. Bardin interpreted the Aleinu prayer, specifically the expression le-taken olam be-malchut shaddai (typically translated as "when the world shall be perfected under the reign of the almighty"), as a responsibility for Jewish people to work towards a better world. However, while Bardin was a significant popularizer of the term, it was used in similar manner in the late 1930s and early 1940s by Alexander Dushkin and Mordecai Kaplan.

As progressive Jewish organizations started entering the mainstream in the 1970s and 1980s, the term tikkun olam began to gain more traction. The term has since been adopted by a variety of Jewish organizations, to mean anything from direct service to general philanthropy. Progressive activist and rabbi Michael Lerner used it for the name of Tikkun magazine, which he started in 1986. It was presented to an international audience — itself an indication of how widely tikkun olam had permeated American Jewish life — when Rabbi Mordecai Waxman used the phrase in a speech addressing Pope John Paul II during his visit to the United States in September 1987.

== Performance of mitzvot ==
Many Jewish texts teach that performing of ritual mitzvot (good deeds, commandments, connections, or religious obligations) is a means of tikkun olam, helping to perfect the world, and that the performance of more mitzvot will hasten the coming of the Messiah and the Messianic Age. This belief is often understood to date back at least to the early Talmudic period. For example, according to Rabbi Yochanan, quoting Shimon bar Yochai, the Jewish people will be redeemed when every Jew observes Shabbat twice in all its details. Some explain that this will occur because Shabbat rest (which is considered a foretaste of the Messianic Age) energizes Jews to work harder to bring the Messianic Age nearer during the six working days of the week. It is expected that in the messianic era there will be no injustice or exploitation, a state comparable with tikkun olam. But applying this idea to all the mitzvot, ritual and ethical, is actually a much later idea that crystallizes within Kabbalah.

=== Ethical behavior ===
In Jewish thought, both ethical and ritual mitzvot are important to the process of tikkun olam. Maimonides writes that tikkun olam requires efforts in all three of the great "pillars" of Judaism: Torah study, acts of kindness, and the ritual commandments. Some Jews believe that performing mitzvot will create a model society among the Jewish people, which will in turn influence the rest of the world. By perfecting themselves, their local Jewish community or the state of Israel, the Jews set an example for the rest of the world. The theme is frequently repeated in sermons and writings across the Jewish spectrum: Reconstructionist, Reform, Conservative, and Orthodox.

Additionally, mitzvot often have practical, worldly, or social effects (in contrast to the mystical impacts, as held by Lurianic Kabbalah).

=== Tzedakah ===
Tzedakah is a central theme in Judaism and serves as one of the 613 commandments. Tzedakah is used in common parlance as charitable giving. Tzedek, the root of tzedakah, means justice or righteousness. Acts of tzedakah are used to generate a more just world. Therefore, tzedakah is a means through which to perform tikkun olam.

Philanthropy is an effective tool in performing tikkun olam as it supports organizations that perform direct service. There are numerous philanthropic organizations dedicated to repairing the world. The Jewish Federations of North America, one of the top ten charities in the world, counts tikkun olam as one of the three main principles under which it operates. Similarly, the American Jewish World Service supports grassroots organizations creating change in Africa, Asia, and the Americas.

The intersection between tzedakah, philanthropy, and tikkun olam is explored by Yehudah Mirsky in his article "Tikkun Olam: Basic Questions and Policy Directions." Mirsky writes:

The rich tradition of tzedakah is a model of communal social responsibility in the absence of a strong welfare state; it also connects to the burgeoning area of Micro Philanthropy, which pools large numbers of small donations resulting in more direct interaction between donors and recipients, or "givers" and "doers," higher resolution in the focus of giving and the creation of new networks of cooperation.

== Building a model society ==
There can be tension between the idea that Jews are responsible for changing society or civilization as whole to be more just, and the idea that by performing the mitzvot, the Jewish people can become a model society that will inspire change in society or civilization as a whole. The latter idea is sometimes attributed to Biblical verses that describe the Jews as "a kingdom of priests and a holy nation" (Exodus 19:5–6) and "a light of the nations" or "a light to the nations" (Isaiah 42:6 and Isaiah 49:6). The philosophies of Rabbi Samson Raphael Hirsch, Rabbi Abraham Isaac Kook, and Rabbi Yehuda Ashlag figure prominently in this area of thought, in rational terms of establishing right or ethical action for all people, and in terms of a kehilla (community) of Jews in galut (the diaspora) influencing their non-Jewish neighbors, in Zionist terms of a Jewish state becoming an exemplar that positively influences the other nations of the world, and mystically in terms of changes effected in the very structure of the universe (Kook and Ashlag). Some other Orthodox rabbis, many, but not all, of them Modern Orthodox, follow a philosophy similar to Hirsch's, including Joseph H. Hertz, Isidore Epstein, and Eliezer Berkovits. The philosophy of Religious Zionism also understands itself to be drawing on Kook's philosophy, though in fact it relies more on Rav Kook's son, whose approach is much more explicitly nationalistic.

In Modern Orthodox philosophy (which often is intertwined with Religious Zionism, especially in America), it is commonly believed that mitzvot have practical this-worldly sociological and educational effects on those who perform them, and, in this manner, the mitzvot will perfect the Jews and the world.

According to the rationalist philosophy of Hirsch and others, the social and ethical mitzvot have nearly self-explanatory purposes, while ritual mitzvot may serve functions such as educating people or developing relationships between people and God. As examples, prayer either inculcates a relationship between people and God or strengthens beliefs and faith of the one who prays, and keeping kosher or wearing tzitzit serve as educational symbols of moral and religious values. Thus, the ultimate goal of mitzvot is for moral and religious values, and deeds, to permeate the Jewish people and, ultimately, the entire world, but the ritual mitzvot nevertheless play a vital role in this model of tikkun olam, strengthening what is accomplished by the ethical.

Horeb by Samson Raphael Hirsch is an especially important source, as his exposition of his philosophy of the mitzvot. He classifies the mitzvot into six categories:

- (1) toroth (philosophical doctrines);
- The ethical mitzvot fall under (2) mishpatim and (3) chukim (commandments of justice towards (living) people and the natural world (including the human body itself) respectively) and (4) mitzvot (commandments of love);
- The ritual mitzvot under (5) edoth (educational symbolic commandments) and (6) avodah (commandments of direct service to God).

Aside from the fact that by perfecting themselves, the Jews set an example for the rest of the world, there is thus the additional distinction that mitzvot have practical, worldly effects — for example, charity benefits the poor materially, constituting tikkun olam by its improvement of the world physically or socially, in contrast to the mystical effects of mitzvot, as held by Lurianic Kabbalah.

== Improving the world ==
For many Jews, the phrase tikkun olam means that Jews are not only responsible for creating a model society among themselves, but also are responsible for all humanity and for the welfare of the society at large. This responsibility may be understood in religious, social, or political terms, and there are many different opinions about how religion, society, and politics interact.

Jane Kanarek, a Conservative rabbi, argues that discussions of tikkun olam in the Mishnah and Talmud point to the importance of creating systemic change through law. She concludes that contemporary tikkun olam should also focus on systemic and structural changes to society.

While many non-Orthodox Jews have argued that tikkun olam requires socially liberal politics, some have argued for the validity of a conservative political approach to tikkun olam. Michael Spiro, a Reconstructionist Jew, draws on a conservative tradition that emphasizes free markets precisely because they believed that was the path to the greatest public good. In addition, conservatives have always emphasized the importance of private efforts of gemilut chasadim (benevolence) and tzedakah (charity or philanthropy), and Spiro argues that tikkun olam should be carried out through such private efforts rather than through government. David Seidenberg, a Renewal and Conservative rabbi, writes about the need to integrate human rights into the foundation of tikkun olam, including in the treatment of Palestinians by Israel, and ecological rights of the more-than-human world.

== Jewish youth organizations ==
Tikkun olam is used to refer to Jewish obligations to engage in social action in the Reform and Conservative movements as well. For example, in USY, the Conservative youth movement, the position in charge of social action on chapter and regional boards is called the SA/TO (social action/tikkun olam) officer. Furthermore, USY has the Abraham Joshua Heschel Honor Society. A requirement of acceptance to the honor society is to perform one act of community service a month. In NFTY, the American branch of Netzer Olami, the Reform youth movement, the position in charge of social action on chapter and regional boards is called the social action vice president (SAVP).

In addition, other youth organizations have also grown to include tikkun olam has part of its foundation. BBYO has community service/social action commitments in both of its divisions, AZA and BBG. BBG includes two different programming areas specific to tikkun olam—one for community service, and another for social action. AZA includes a combined community service/social action programming area. In addition, both divisions include "pledge principles", principles by which to guide them. For BBG girls the "menorah pledge principles" include citizenship, philanthropy, and community service. For AZA members, the "7 cardinal principles" include charity.

== Jewish fundamentalism ==
Elon University professor Geoffrey Claussen has argued that concepts of tikkun olam have inspired Jewish fundamentalists such as the convicted terrorist Meir Kahane and monarchist Yitzchak Ginsburgh. According to Claussen, "while visions of tikkun olam may reflect humility, thoughtfulness, and justice, they are often marked by arrogance, overzealousness, and injustice".

== See also ==
- Eschatology
- Ethics
  - Jewish ethics
  - Moral idealism
