= List of B'nai B'rith Girls chapters =

Jewish teen groups

B'nai B'rith Girls (BBG) is an international youth-led high school sorority for Jewish teenagers. BBG originated as independent chapters in 1926 and became a wing of BBYO in 1944, now considered BBG's founding date. Following is an incomplete list of BBG chapters.

Number	Chapter	Charter date and range	Location	Status	Ref.
1	San Francisco	April 22, 1944–19xx ?; May 9, 2019	San Francisco, California	Active	
2	Oakland	April 22, 1944	Oakland, California	Active	
3	Linda Strauss	April 22, 1944	Los Angeles, California	Inactive	
4	Harrisburg - Machar	April 22, 1944	Harrisburg, Pennsylvania	Active	
5	Highland Park	April 22, 1944	Los Angeles, California	Inactive	
6	Judah	April 22, 1944	Worcester, Massachusetts	Inactive	
7		April 22, 1944	Lancaster, Pennsylvania	Inactive	
8	Ramah	April 22, 1944	Chicago, Illinois	Inactive	
9		April 22, 1944	Pottsville, Pennsylvania	Inactive	
10		April 22, 1944	Homestead, Pennsylvania	Inactive	
14	L'Olam		Miami, Florida	Active	
18	Shemesh	19xx ?–xxxx ?; December 18, 2017	Cherry Hill, New Jersey	Active	
23	West Essex		West Essex, New Jersey	Active	
25	Sharm El Sheikh	19xx ?–19xx ?; June 13, 1966		Inactive	
28	Sameach	19xx ?–19xx ?; December 30, 1966		Inactive	
39	Wexler Clark		Savannah, Georgia	Active	
40	Saadia		Overland Park, Kansas	Active	
41	Yachad		Livingston, New Jersey	Inactive	
43	B'Yachad Shelia Greenwald		Indianapolis, Indiana	Active	
45	Shimron		Florida	Inactive	
53	Shana		Ohio	Inactive	
58	Vered Hazakah		Aventura, Florida	Active	
63	Houston		Houston, Texas	Active	
70	Zachal		West Bloomfield, Michigan	Active	
73	SC. Fidelity		California	Inactive	
81	Shoshanna		Michigan	Inactive	
85	Lev Kesef		Cleveland, Ohio	Active	
87	Dayenu		Pittsburgh, Pennsylvania	Active	
88	Signa		Miami, Florida	Inactive	
103	Eden		Scarsdale, New York	Active	
106	San Pedro		California	Inactive	
109	Hannah Shenesh		San Rafael, California	Inactive	
110	Dafna		Cherry Hill, New Jersey	Active	
111	Gal Chadash		San Diego, California	Active	
124	Achva		West Hartford, Connecticut	Active	
133	Harry S. Albert		Peterson, New Jersey	Inactive	
134	B'Yachad		Tampa, Florida	Active	
140	Shashona	19xx ?–19xx ?; December 29, 1965	California	Inactive	
143			Charleston, South Carolina	Inactive	
145	Rosedale	19xx ?–19xx ?; February 4, 1974	New York City, New York	Inactive	
156	Emunah		West Bloomfield, Michigan	Active	
158	Galim		Rockville, Maryland	Active	
159	Yachad		Washington, D.C.	Active	
163	Rubin-Gilbert		Fort Worth, Texas	Inactive	
165	N'shama Hyatt		Denver, Colorado	Active	
170	Teva		Saint Paul, Minnesota	Active	
180	Ahavah		Harrison, New York	Active	
186	Magic City		Birmingham, Alabama	Active	
201	V'ruach		Denver, Colorado	Active	
221	Alton Silver	1946–199x ?; 2011–2016	Fort Worth, Texas	Inactive	(Note: Chapter was called Judah Touro in 1956. Its name was changed when it absorbed the Balfour chapter in 1956.)
	Arthur Balfour	196x ?–1967	Fort Worth, Texas	Consolidated	(Note: Merged into Alton Silver when membership in both chapters declined.)
	Samuel Gompers	196x ?–1967	Fort Worth, Texas	Consolidated	(Note: Consolidated with Rubin-Gilbert when membership in both chapters declined.)
229	L'Olam		Vancouver, British Columbia, Canada	Active	
232	Y'ad L'Yad		Edmonton, Alberta, Canada	Active	
233	Ruach		New England	Inactive	
243	Nona Bloch Salomon		Tulsa, Oklahoma	Active	
247	Ha'ela		West Palm Beach, Florida	Active	
252	B'yachad		Denver, Colorado	Active	
275	Sabra	19xx–19xx ?; February 16, 1972		Inactive	
277	Lena Karesh		Columbia, South Carolina	Active	
293	Ahavah		West Bloomfield, Michigan	Active	
304	Achshav		Rockville, Maryland	Active	
308	Dora Savage		West Bloomfield, Michigan	Active	
311	Daughters of the Star		Calgary, Alberta, Canada	Active	
313	Portland		Portland, Oregon	Active	
316	Ha'lom		Miami, Florida	Active	
317	Rebecca	19xx–19xx ?; June 1, 1961	Ohio	Inactive	
318	Henry Barnston		Houston, Texas	Active	
320	Shenandoah	19xx–19xx ?; December 14, 1964		Inactive	
321	Randolph B'resheit		New Jersey	Inactive	
322	Y'ad L'Yad		Edmonton, Alberta, Canada	Active	
324	Lilith		Sherman Oaks, California	Active	
325	Chabibi		Minneapolis, Minnesota	Active	
326	Waldflowers		Maitland, Florida	Active	
327	Ruach		Marlboro, New Jersey	Active	
331	Daughters of the Star		Calgary, Alberta, Canada	Active	
335	Ruth Clark			Inactive	
336	Rabbi Joseph		Texas	Inactive	
339	Lahat		Fairfax County, Virginia	Active	
340	Yachad		Roslyn Heights, New York	Active	
362	Shalom		California	Inactive	
368	Aliah		Columbus, Ohio	Active	
372	Etta Spier		Greensboro, North Carolina	Active	
373	Raleigh Durham Yo			Inactive	
382	Shoshana	19xx–19xx ?; September 19, 1977	Michigan	Inactive	
392	Koach		Livingston, New Jersey	Active	
396	Fannie Sablosky		Dallas, Texas	Active	
407	B'not Shalom		Toledo, Ohio	Active	
411	Sholom Edgewater			Inactive	
415	Reba Holub		Ohio	Inactive	
418	Ohavim		Charlotte, North Carolina	Active	
419	Kulanu		West Bloomfield, Michigan	Active	
420	Salt Lake City		Salt Lake City, Utah	Active	
433	Litzor		Austin, Texas	Active	
456	Rego Park Brotherhood		New York City, New York	Inactive	
457	Sarelles		New York City, New York	Inactive	
460	Citadel		Hempstead, New York	Active	
461	Integrity		Merrick, New York	Active	
464	Ruach	19xx–19xx ?; December 15, 2018	Washington, D.C.	Active	
476	Shamru		California	Inactive	
490	Short Hills		Millburn, New Jersey	Active	
497	Fabian		Paterson, New Jersey	Inactive	
498	Chaverim		Winnipeg, Manitoba, Canada	Active	
509	Salinas		Salinas, California	Inactive	
510	Ediar		Omaha, Nebraska	Active	
511	Richard Tucker		Michigan	Inactive	
531	Judy Ann Leven		Providence, Rhode Island	Active	
532	Shore		New Jersey	Inactive	
537	Rose Belz Kringer		Memphis, Tennessee	Active	
552	Chai Chaverim		Charlotte, North Carolina	Active	
548	Shomrai			Inactive	
555	Shaaron		Ontario, Canada	Inactive	
583	Scenic City			Inactive	
591	Rachel		St. Louis, Missouri	Inactive	
592		December 1965	West Los Angeles, California	Inactive	
594	Emma Lazarus		Kansas City, Missouri	Inactive	
605	Mayim Chayim		Newton, Massachusetts	Active	
622	Rachel			Inactive	
627	R.J. Miller			Inactive	
636	Gert Weinstien		Knoxville, Tennessee	Active	
637	Rabbi Les Geiger		New Jersey	Inactive	
638	Aliah		Columbus, Ohio	Active	
639	Beth Kadima		Montgomery County, Maryland	Active	
646	Joyce Eva Kiviat		Phoenix, Arizona	Active	
658	Sababa		Philadelphia, Pennsylvania	Active	
672	Rena Chaim		Buffalo, New York	Inactive	
695	Sarasota Yo		Florida	Inactive	
699	Rohanue		Omaha, Nebraska	Inactive	
710	Ediar		Omaha, Nebraska	Inactive	
731	Ruach	19xx–19xx ?; March 13, 1974		Inactive	
739	Ronny's			Inactive	
746	Shebaygan Yo		Wisconsin	Inactive	
750	Shalom		Wisconsin	Inactive	
757	Silver Star			Inactive	
763	Gabriels		Winnipeg, Manitoba, Canada	Active	
783	Remsen		New York City, New York	Inactive	
785	Sabras		New York City, New York	Inactive	
788	Shoshana Gershon		New York City, New York	Inactive	
794	Neshama		Armonk, New York	Active	
794	Neshama		Chappaqua, New York	Active	
794	Neshama		Mount Kisco, New York	Active	
810	Sarat		New York City, New York	Inactive	
817	Ruach		New York City, New York	Inactive	
819	Sagamore	19xx–19xx ?; March 19, 1965	Nassau County, New York	Inactive	
826	Hakotel		Rockville Center, New York	Active	
829	Ruach	19xx–19xx ?; March 31, 1966		Inactive	
836	Shenango Valley			Inactive	
847	Silhouettes		Montreal, Quebec, Canada	Inactive	
849	Korczak		Evanston, Illinois	Active	
849	Korczak		Skokie, Illinois	Active	
849	Korczak		Wilmette, Illinois	Active	
867	Shalomettes	19xx–19xx ?; January 31, 1967	Montreal, Quebec	Inactive	
905	Rabbi J. Gerson Brenner			Inactive	
909	Shalom	19xx–19xx ?; January 31, 1966		Inactive	
931	Rahway-Colonia		New Jersey	Inactive	
932	Koach		Livingston, New Jersey	Active	
933	Palisades		Bergenfield, New Jersey	Inactive	
935	Sabra	19xx–19xx ?; December 9, 1964	Ontario, Canada	Inactive	
949	Rancho Park		California	Inactive	
956	D'Vash		Northridge, California	Active	
957	Sephora		California	Inactive	
979	Ramban	19xx–19xx ?; May 29, 1973	Michigan	Inactive	
987	Hatikvah		Cleveland, Ohio	Active	
991	Regina		Canada	Inactive	
1027	Shonettes		Montreal, Quebec, Canada	Inactive	
1039	Shoshannah		California	Inactive	
1055	Shalom	19xx–19xx ?; November 8, 1967	Montreal, Quebec, Canada	Inactive	
1056	Sabras		Montreal, Quebec, Canada	Inactive	
1058	Shoshannah		Nassau County, New York	Inactive	
1066	Selewan		New York	Inactive	
1090	Prince of Wales Yo			Inactive	
1096	Pascack Valley		Washington Township, New Jersey	Active	
1110	Dafna		Cherry Hill, New Jersey	Active	
1116	Shalom		New Jersey	Inactive	
1124	Raberta Beresner			Inactive	
1133	Savannah		Savannah, Georgia	Inactive	
1134			Charleston, South Carolina	Inactive	
1142	Sarors		Montreal, Quebec, Canada	Inactive	
1153	Beth Shean		West Hills, California	Active	
1172	Dr. Abraham Cohen		Richmond, Virginia	Active	
1188	Allentown - Danielle Goren		Allentown, Pennsylvania	Active	
1192	Roselle		New Jersey	Inactive	
1197	Shoshanah		Hudson Valley, New York	Inactive	
1199	Shalom Yo			Inactive	
1204	Rio Grande Valley Yo		Texas	Inactive	
1208	Aliyah		West Bloomfield, Michigan	Active	
1210	Celeste Sobol		Denver, Colorado	Active	
1213	Kadimah		Tucson, Arizona	Active	
1219	Judy Kravitz		Dallas, Texas	Active	
1226	Shoshanna		Midwestern United States	Inactive	
1233	Tikvah		Stamford, Connecticut	Active	
1234	Rossmoor		California	Inactive	
1240	Halom		Seattle, Washington	Active	
1260	Sabras		New York City, New York	Inactive	
1261	Shoshanot		New York City, New York	Inactive	
1273	Sharonne	19xx ?–19xx ?; July 13, 1974		Inactive	
1297	Sameach		Ohio	Inactive	
1298	Shoshanah		Ohio	Inactive	
1300	Revia Chadash	19xx ?–19xx ?; December 30, 1966	Montreal, Quebec	Inactive	
1316	Shalom		Ohio	Inactive	
1319	Hashemesh	19xx ?–19xx ?; February 22, 1972		Inactive	
1330	Reena			Inactive	
1334	Renan			Inactive	
1337	Sabra		California	Inactive	
1339	Shomrim		Nassau County, New York	Inactive	
1340	Shalom		New York	Inactive	
1357	Ruth		Ohio	Inactive	
1360	Rabbi A. Martin			Inactive	
1393	Bella Abzug		Portland, Oregon	Active	
1410	Shalomettes		Montreal, Quebec	Inactive	
1454	Shoshonim		Montreal, Quebec	Inactive	
1458	Las Hermanitas		Denver, Colorado	Active	
1460	Rav Yisrael Yo		Omaha, Nebraska	Inactive	
1461	Ahava		Edmonton, Alberta, Canada	Active	
1465	Sabra		Bay Area, CA	Inactive	
1466	Kinneret		Kansas City, Missouri	Inactive	
1467	Ahava		Kansas City, Missouri	Inactive	
1468	Rabbi Abraham Herson			Inactive	
1474	Rosen			Inactive	
1487	Shalom		Wisconsin	Inactive	
1498	Rose H Klein		Baltimore, Maryland	Inactive	
1508	Jay Levine		Louisville, Kentucky	Active	
1512	Ahavah		Wayne, New Jersey	Active	
1516	Jerusalem Shel Zahav		Cupertino, California	Active	
1516	Jerusalem Shel Zahav		Sunnyvale, California	Active	
1519	Masada		East Meadow, New York	Active	
1528	Shalom		Washington D.C.	Inactive	
1541			Charleston, South Carolina	Inactive	
1547	Samuel D. Arons		Woodbridge, Connecticut	Active	
1548	Ruth			Inactive	
1549	Shoshannah		Washington, D.C.	Inactive	
1561	Tikvah		Wilmington, Delaware	Active	
1575	Shalvah			Inactive	
1588	Rokefet		New Jersey	Inactive	
1604	Ginny Weinstein		Dallas, Texas	Active	
1611	Raleigh			Inactive	
1613	Shoshana		Pittsburgh, Pennsylvania	Active	
1618	Shaina		Raleigh, North Carolina	Active	
1621	Hatikvah		Dayton, Ohio	Active	
1635	Kochavim		Lafayette Hill, Pennsylvania	Active	
1636	Shoshanna			Inactive	
1655	Shalom		New York City, New York	Inactive	
1658	Shorim		Montreal, Quebec	Inactive	
1666	Shalom		New York City, New York	Inactive	
1670	Shalom		New England	Inactive	
1681	Ruach			Inactive	
1682	Shalom			Inactive	
1689	Tikvah Marla Zeiff		Sharon, Massachusetts	Active	
1710	Seaside		South Jersey	Inactive	
1724	Mapso		Maplewood, New Jersey	Active	
1728	Chai		Foster City, California	Active	
1728	Chai		San Mateo, California	Active	
1738	Shayna		California	Inactive	
1747	Savannah MIT's		Georgia	Inactive	
1750	Simcha		Norfolk, Virginia	Active	
1756	Shalom		Ontario	Inactive	
1760	Renanim		Georgia	Inactive	
1764	Music City		Nashville, Tennessee	Active	
1794	Quakertown Yo			Inactive	
1798	Orali		Baltimore County, Maryland	Active	
1828	Chaverim		Flossmoor, Illinois	Active	
1855	Ruach		Montreal, Quebec	Inactive	
1859	Shanah		California	Inactive	
1863	El Al		Palo Alto, California	Active	
1866	William S. Malev		Houston, Texas	Active	
1889	Ruach		Ohio	Inactive	
1890	Shebanan		Manitoba, Canada	Inactive	
1898	Shalom El Amee			Inactive	
1900	Shana Madalais		Nassau County, New York	Inactive	
1907	Ruach		Georgia	Inactive	
1913	Shoshana		Ohio	Inactive	
1919	Sabra			Inactive	
1924	Sally Blum			Inactive	
1938	Helene Gorbena		Las Vegas, Nevada	Active	
1950	Yad B Yad		Marlboro, New Jersey	Active	
1963	Ruach		Florida	Inactive	
1967	Ruach			Inactive	
1974	Leviticeem		Holland, Pennsylvania	Active	
1977	Prochim		California	Inactive	
1992	Scotch Plains		New Jersey	Inactive	
1999	Ruach			Inactive	
2009	Revolution		New York City, New York	Inactive	
2012	Samuel Ofengard		New England	Inactive	
2020	Tikvah		Manalapan, New Jersey	Active	
2025	Shalom		New York	Inactive	
2028	Shoshana		Miami, Florida	Inactive	
2032	Rocket City Yo			Inactive	
2036	Riverdale		New York City, New York	Inactive	
2037	Randallstown		Baltimore, Maryland	Inactive	
2040	Stephen S. Wise		Houston, Texas	Active	
2043	Atz' Chaim		San Jose, California	Active	
2045	Ruach		Ontario	Inactive	
2048	Sababa		San Antonio, Texas	Inactive	
2053	MZ Yoshanah		Omaha, Nebraska	Active	
2054	River City		Memphis, Tennessee	Active	
2059	Shalom		Georgia	Inactive	
2064	Ahavah		Milwaukee, Wisconsin	Active	
2065	Rishonah		New York City, New York	Inactive	
2066	Samuel Beber		California	Inactive	
2067	Shoshanna		Hudson Valley, New York	Inactive	
2068	Shoshana		Miami, Florida	Inactive	
2069	Rainbow		Little Neck, New York	Active	
2072	Sameach			Inactive	
2083	Neshef		Cherry Hill, New Jersey	Active	
2094	Golda Meir		Cleveland, Ohio	Active	
2096	Shayna		New York City, New York	Inactive	
2117	Tovah		Phoenix, Arizona	Active	
2120	L'Hadash Ahava		Danville, California	Inactive	
2128	Rome Yo			Inactive	
2129	Sam Weinstein Yo			Inactive	
2139	Zahav		Calgary, Alberta, Canada	Active	
2141	Shoshanim			Inactive	
2143	Sabras		New York City, New York	Inactive	
2169	Ruachalom		Georgia	Inactive	
2172	Shira	19xx ?–19xx ?; December 12, 1986	St. Louis, Missouri	Active	
2183	Shareme		New York	Inactive	
2189	Schenectady		New Jersey	Inactive	
2197	Renaissance		New York City, New York	Inactive	
2219	Shoshanim			Inactive	
2224	Achayot		Seattle, Washington	Active	
2231	Shoshana		New York City, New York	Inactive	
2248	Tziporah		Toronto, Ontario, Canada	Active	
2249	Sabra		Ontario, Canada	Inactive	
2254	Shayna Maydelahs		New York City, New York	Inactive	
2258	Sheila Greenwald			Inactive	
2276	Sabra		Georgia	Inactive	
2280	Bat Sheva		Winnipeg, Manitoba, Canada	Active	
2283	Quintesence		New York	Inactive	
2289	Ahavah		Montgomery County, Maryland	Active	
2292	Shanah			Inactive	
2294	Shoshanim		Montreal, Quebec, Canada	Inactive	
2296	Shira		Ontario, Canada	Inactive	
2299	Summit		Jericho, New York	Active	
2303	Ahavah		Syosset, New York	Active	
2307	Chaverot		Thornhill, Ontario, Canada	Active	
2310	Leah Faye		Denver, Colorado	Active	
2312	Ruach		Mill Basin, Brooklyn, New York City, New York	Active	
2323	Ruach			Inactive	
2333	Shalom		New York City, New York	Inactive	
2340	Signon		Midwestern United States	Inactive	
2342	Chevrah		Cherry Hill, New Jersey	Active	
2350	Genesis		Commack, New York	Active	
2353	Re'at		Ontario, Canada	Inactive	
2362	Halev		Boca Raton, Florida	Active	
2367	Sha'char		Miami, Florida	Inactive	
2371	Salelim		Ontario, Canada	Inactive	
2374	Shamiam		New York City, New York	Inactive	
2376	Ruach		New York City, New York	Inactive	
2378	T'lalim		Coral Springs, Florida	Active	
2379	Ruach		Ontario, Canada	Inactive	
2381	Resnick			Inactive	
2383	Achot		Reisterstown, Maryland	Active	
2391	N'shama		Montgomergy County, Maryland	Active	
2397	Susan Mardi Shapiro		Phoenix, Arizona	Active	
2398	Chana Senisch		Reisterstown, Maryland	Active	
2400	Russian		Wisconsin	Inactive	
2404	Dor Chadash		Vaughan, Ontario, Canada	Active	
2408	Prophecy		Florida	Inactive	
2414	Ahavah		Buffalo Grove, Illinois	Active	
2416	Shal-Shav		Miami, Florida	Inactive	
2418	L'chaim		Dix Hills, New York	Active	
2430	B'not Lev		Overland Park, Kansas	Active	
2433	Sababa			Inactive	
2435	Richmond Hill		Richmond Hill, Ontario, Canada	Inactive	
2436	Shemesh		Georgia	Inactive	
2441	N'Shamah		Miami, Florida	Active	
2443	Malachim		Eugene, Oregon	Active	
2444	L'Chaim		Toronto, Ontario, Canada	Active	
2447	Ahava		Vaughan, Ontario, Canada	Active	
2453	Ohev		Cherry Hill, New Jersey	Active	
2455	Beshert		Montgomergy County, Maryland	Active	
2458	Eden		Milwaukee, Wisconsin	Active	
2461	Ra Anan		Wisconsin	Inactive	
2462	Echad		Westlake, California	Active	
2466	Kallah		Bayside, New York	Active	
2473	Tikvah		Houston, Texas	Active	
2478	Shamayim		Florida	Inactive	
2479	Ruach		Florida	Inactive	
2484	Kochavim		Toronto, Ontario, Canada	Active	
2488	Sababa		San Antonio, Texas	Active	
2490	Ner Tamid		Cincinnati, Ohio	Active	
2493	Shorashim		Dunwoody, Georgia	Active	
2493	Shorashim		Sandy Springs, Georgia	Active	
2495	B'yachad		Atlanta, Georgia	Active	
2504	Shamayim		Georgia	Inactive	
2506	Kesher		Davie, Florida	Active	
2509	Aviva		Buffalo Grove, Illinois	Active	
2512	Sababa		Five Towns, New York	Active	
2513	Kochavim		Los Angeles, California	Active	
2514	Jane Beber Abramson		Deerfield, Illinois	Active	
2514	Jane Beber Abramson		Highland Park, Illinois	Active	
2514	Jane Beber Abramson		Northbrook, Illinois	Active	
2517	Sababa		St. Louis, Missouri	Inactive	
2521	B'sheret		Milwaukee, Wisconsin	Active	
2525	Emunah		Northport, New York	Active	
2526	Chana Leah		Pittsburgh, Pennsylvania	Inactive	
2527	Lehavah		Dunwoody, Georgia	Active	
2527	Lehavah		Sandy Springs, Georgia	Active	
2528	Or Chadash		Fairfax, Virginia	Active	
2529	Ko'ach		Bethesda, Maryland	Active	
2530	Zera		Davie, Florida	Active	
2534	Ra'naan		Austin, Texas	Active	
2536	Neshikot		Saratoga, California	Active	
2538	Par Par		Port Washington, New York	Active	
2539	Lev Hadarom		East Cobb, Georgia	Active	
2540	Josephine Esther Mentzer		Los Altos, California	Active	
2540	Josephine Esther Mentzer		Mountain View, California	Active	
2541	Chai Tov		Chicago, Illinois	Active	
2543	Acharit		Boca Raton, Florida	Active	
2544	Yafah		Boynton Beach, Florida	Active	
2545	Aviv		Scarsdale, New York	Active	
2546	Beyla		Rockville, Maryland	Active	
2547	Mishpucha		MetroWest, Massachusetts	Active	
2548	Mizrah		Alpharetta, Georgia	Active	
2548	Mizrah		North Metro, Georgia	Active	
2549	Osher		Alpharetta, Georgia	Active	
2549	Osher		North Meto, Georgia	Active	
2550	Tikvah		Denver, Colorado	Active	
2551	Hilah		Howard County, Maryland	Active	
2552	Mishpacha		Naples, Florida	Active	
2553	Anachnu Tamid		Sarasota, Florida	Active	
2555	Kol Echad		Bryn Mawr, Pennsylvania	Active	
2559	L'dor Vador		New York City, New York	Active	
2560	Negev		Naples, Florida	Active	
2599	L'dor Vador		New York City, New York	Active	
2661	L'Olam		Weston, Florida	Active	
2662	Adirah		Fairfield, Connecticut	Active	
5003	Simcha		Vaughan, Ontario, Canada	Active	
5059	Shaqul Pleasantville		New Jersey	Inactive	
5064	Haganah		Loudoun, Virginia	Active	
5173	Mishpacha		Hamilton, Ontario, Canada	Active	
8000	Richmond Unassigned			Inactive	
	Monskly	February 1952	Brentwood, California	Inactive	
	TIkvah	November 1990	Plantation, Florida	Inactive	
		November 1960	Rockland County, New York	Inactive	
	Bucks County		Bucks County, Pennsylvania	Colony	
	Cammy Resnick		Dallas, Texas	Colony	
	Glen Rock		Fair Lawn, New Jersey	Colony	
	Glen Rock		Glen Rock, New Jersey	Colony	
	Glen Rock		Ridgewood, New Jersey	Colony	
	Great Neck		Great Neck, New York	Colony	
	Haganah		Loudon County, Virginia	Colony	
	Hasmechot		Montreal, Quebec, Canada		
	Heart of America		Kansas City, Missouri	Colony	
	Maplewood S. Orange		Maplewood, New Jersey	Colony	
	Maplewood S. Orange		South Orange, New Jersey	Colony	
	Montreal		Montreal, Quebec, Canada	Colony	
	New Northshore		Deerfield, Illinois	Colony	
	New Northshore		Glenview, Illinois	Colony	
	New Northshore		Highland Park, Illinois	Colony	
	New Northshore		Northbrook, Illinois	Colony	
	Sababa		Tarrytown, New York	Colony	
	San Francisco		San Francisco, California	Colony	
	Southeast Montgomery County		Philadelphia, Pennsylvania	Colony	
	Twin Cities		Minneapolis, Minnesota	Colony	
	Twin Cities		Saint Paul, Minnesota	Colony	
	West Essex		Caldwell, New Jersey	Colony	
