= B'nai B'rith Perlman Camp =

American Jewish summer camp

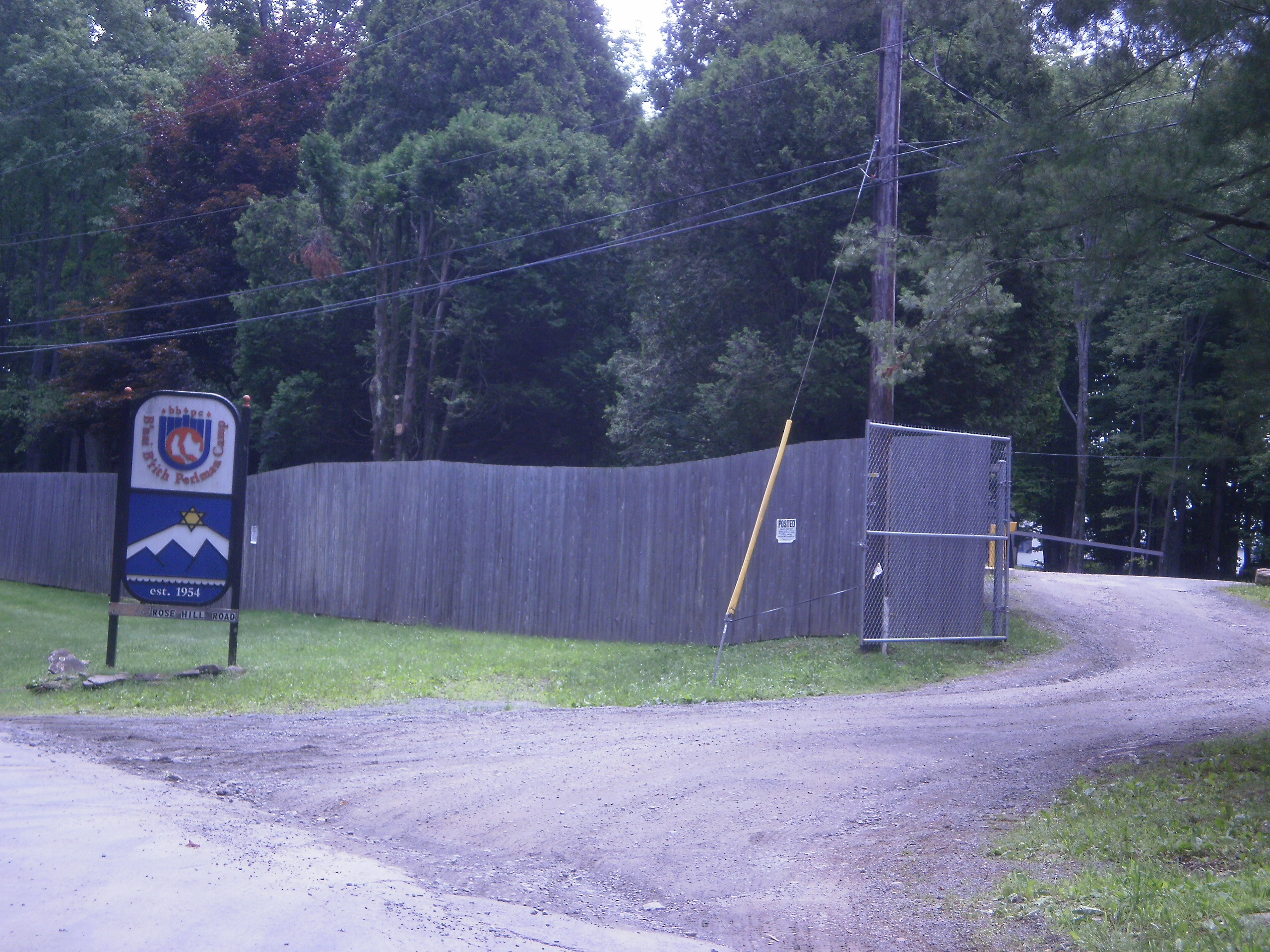
Entrance to B'nai B'rith Perlman Camp

Perlman Camp is a Jewish summer camp located in Lake Como, Pennsylvania, United States. The camp first opened in 1954 on the site of the former Camp Windsor; it has also been known as Camp B'nai B'rith (CBB) and B'nai B'rith Perlman Camp (BBPC). Before being acquired by B'nai B'rith January 1954, the 365-acre (1.48 km^{2}) campground with a 13-acre (53,000 m^{2}) lake was known as Camp Windsor.

Camp B'nai B'rith was renamed B'nai B'rith Perlman Camp (BBPC) on 19 August 1975, after the founder of B'nai B'rith Girls, Anita Perlman. This was followed by the purchase of Burr Oaks in Mukwonago, Wisconsin, which was then named B'nai B'rith Beber Camp.

== History leading up to B'nai B'rith's acquisition ==
In 1947, after hearing a report on the subject, the B'nai B'rith Supreme Lodge convention authorized the purchase of a camp to meet the growing need for a youth camp where leadership development and conventions could meet. In the spring of 1949, the B'nai B'rith-Henry Monsky Foundation was officially formed with the hopes of buying real estate, including a campground. The search for a campground began to come into life with a run-down property.

B'nai B'rith District 3 operated a home for orphans in Fairview, Pennsylvania for a number of years, though it had become abandoned by the 1940s. In the early 1950s, District 3's leadership made an offer to make the grounds "available to the Supreme Lodge for a youth encampment." Because the property was neither in good condition nor a good location, B'nai B'rith was able to close down the property, sell off the assets and transfer them, worth nearly $200,000, to the Monsky Foundation.

The Foundation was then able to purchase for $175,000, in January 1954, a 365-acre (148 ha) camp with a 13 acres (5.3 ha) lake at an elevation of 1,800 feet (550 m), originally known as Camp Windsor, located in Starlight in the northeastern corner of Pennsylvania. Five months later, in June, Camp B'nai B'rith was dedicated, and meetings were held there as well as a summer camp season for younger children.

== Youth Camp ==
Perlman Camp's mission is to provide children with a safe, fun, and enriching summer camp experience in a Jewish environment. The camp offers a fun and inclusive family atmosphere, which provides opportunities for growth and the development of a sense of self. This pluralistic Jewish environment enhances teamwork, cooperation and leadership in the camp community and beyond. B'nai B'rith Perlman Camp is a traditional camping experience that encompasses athletics, arts, aquatics, outdoor adventure, and fosters Jewish values, morals and ethics.

Camp sessions include a 2-week (Rookie Camp), as well as 3, 4, and 7-week sessions. Campers entering grades 3-10 are housed in bunks, and divided into three divisions: freshmores, juniors, and seniors. Teen campers participate in a two-year leadership track program, including the 11th grade Pioneer (PIO) program, and the 12th grade Staff-in-Training (SIT) program.

Campers participate in a variety of activities on a daily basis, including swim and waterfront activities, athletics, arts, drama, and music. Each week, campers may choose to participate in three hobbies, where they can develop skills in their individual areas of interest. Special camp programs include overnights, trips to amusement parks, a 4th of July carnival, Israel Day, and Maccabiah (color war).

== BBYO Leadership Training ==
Starting in 1957, BBYO began to hold leadership training programs at the camp. In 1959, the first International Leadership Training Conference was held there. In 1961, Kallah was started to be held there prior to this ILTC. For many years, up until 2005, BBYO's International Convention was held in the summer at B'nai B'rith Perlman Camp.

== See also ==
- Camp Airy
- Isabella Freedman Jewish Retreat Center
- Camp Kinder Ring
- Camp Louise
- Camp Scatico
- B'nai B'rith Beber Camp
