= List of Aleph Zadik Aleph chapters =

Aleph Zadik Aleph is an international fraternal organization for Jewish teenagers. It was founded on May 3, 1924 in Omaha, Nebraska. It is the male wing of BBYO. Aleph Zadik Aleph chapters are located across the United States and in more than forty other countries. Following is a partial list of chapters.

Number	Chapter name	Charter date and range	Location	Status	Ref.
1	Mother Chapter	May 3, 1924	Omaha, Nebraska	Active	
2	Greater KC	May 1924	Overland Park, Kansas	Active	
3		June 1924	Lincoln, Nebraska	Inactive	
4		June 1924	Des Moines, Iowa	Inactive	
6	Judge Saul Pinchick		Denver, Colorado	Active	
8	Zel Shrell		Minneapolis, Minnesota	Active	
22	Nordaunian		Overland Park, Kansas	Active	
31	First International	1927	Calgary, Alberta, Canada	Active	
38	Chadda		Winnipeg, Manitoba, Canada	Active	
39	Bereshis		Milwaukee, Wisconsin	Active	
41	Rabbi Abraham J. Mesch		Birmingham, Alabama	Active	
55	Heart of Ohio		Columbus, Ohio	Active	
63	Kishon		West Bloomfield, Michigan	Active	
65	Sol Stern		Portland, Oregon	Active	
		1938	Tel Aviv, Israel	Inactive	
	Royal Palm	1944	Florida	Inactive	
70	Brown Smullin Neufeld		Toledo, Ohio	Active	
71	Israel H Peres		Memphis, Tennessee	Active	
84	Salt Lake City		Salt Lake City, Utah	Active	
100	Sam Beber		Omaha, Nebraska	Inactive	
107	Joseph Rauch	April 1957 – 1977	Louisville, Kentucky	Inactive	
110	Nadav		West Hartford, Connecticut	Active	
119	Eli Cohen		Vancouver, British Columbia, Canada	Active	
121	Mandel Bloomfield		Edmonton, Alberta, Canada	Active	
122	Marc Chagall		San Diego, California	Active	
126	Simon Atlas	1930	Rockville, Maryland	Active	(Note: Chapter was originally located in Silver Spring, Maryland.)
128	Larry Urie		Harrisburg, Pennsylvania	Active	
135	Morton Lewis		Dallas, Texas	Active	
143		1931	Charleston, South Carolina	Inactive	
151	Hank Greenberg		West Bloomfield, Michigan	Active	
155	Pops DSK	19xx ?–19xx ?; November 1, 1950	Columbus, Ohio	Active	
156	Allentown - Rabbi William Greenburg		Allentown, Pennsylvania	Active	
164	Brian L. Domchick		Wilmington, Delaware	Active	
195	Ramon	October 28, 1991	Cupertino, California	Active	(Note: Chapter was formed as Dr. Seuss AZA #195 but had to change its name for legal reasons.)
195	Ramon	October 28, 1991	Sunnyvale, California	Active	(Note: Chapter was formed as Dr. Seuss AZA #195 but had to change its name for legal reasons.)
206	David Finn		Savannah, Georgia	Active	
222	Jordan Kronen		Boca Raton, Florida	Active	
245	Chapel		Cherry Hill, New Jersey	Active	
246	Indy Brae Sheath		Indianapolis, Indiana	Active	
254	Paul Schwartz		Columbia, South Carolina	Active	
258	Athens of the South		Nashville, Tennessee	Active	
275	Freeman Vad		Denver, Colorado	Active	
276	Feenberg-Rubin		Tulsa, Oklahoma	Active	
309	Tzavah		West Bloomfield, Michigan	Active	
311	Adolph Burger		Tampa, Florida	Active	
313	Evan Shapiro		West Bloomfield, Michigan	Active	
317	Al Jolson		West Bloomfield, Michigan	Active	
337	Max Fisher		West Bloomfield, Michigan	Active	
355	Monterey Bay	October 1939	Santa Cruz, California	Inactive	
360	Chaim Weizmann		Portland, Oregon	Active	
370	Old Dominion		Norfolk, Virginia	Active	
389	Gateway		Pittsburgh, Pennsylvania	Active	
420	Rabbi Isaac Winick		Knoxville, Tennessee	Active	
434	Cyrus Adler		Houston, Texas	Active	
442	Rebels		Orlando, Florida	Active	
455	Homestead	1933–late 1950s	Homestead, Pennsylvania	Inactive	
456	J.F.K.		Los Angeles, California	Active	
471			Lynn, Massachusetts	Inactive	
490	Mishpocha		Cincinnati, Ohio	Active	
505	Mac Miller		Cleveland, Ohio	Active	
545	House of David		Burlingame, California	Active	
600	West Essex		Caldwell, New Jersey	Active	
674	Nathan Henry Miller		Oakland, California	Inactive	
705	Hank Greenspun		Denver, Colorado	Active	
734	Philip Klutznick		Denver, Colorado	Active	
760	Sigmund Selig Pearl		Greensboro, North Carolina	Active	
768	Louis Halfant		Galveston, Texas	Inactive	
791	Henry Monsky		Dallas, Texas	Active	
817	Chesapeake		Owings Mills, Maryland	Active	
827	Dynasty		Winnipeg, Manitoba, Canada	Active	
841	Rubin Kaplan		Dallas, Texas	Active	
843	Hurricanes		Miami, Florida	Active	
875	Tibor Rubin		Austin, Texas	Active	
885	Point Woodmere	19xx ?–19xx ?; December 9, 1965			
932	Louis D. Brandeis		Dallas, Texas	Active	
948	Mickey Barak Aberman		Charlotte, North Carolina	Active	
983	Zion		Northridge, California	Active	
1005	Nesher		Plainview, New York	Active	
1016	Achim		Vaughan, Ontario, Canada	Active	
1033	Achim		Sarasota, Florida	Active	
1043	Eastside		Seattle, Washington	Active	
1046	Stampede		Calgary, Alberta, Canada	Active	
1094	Harry S Truman		Kansas City, Missouri	Active	
1094	Harry S Truman		Overland Park, Kansas	Active	
1111	Exodus		Thornhill, Ontario, Canada	Active	
1204	Lester Sherman Okeon		Memphis, Tennessee	Active	
1213	Primal				
1215	Dayan	xxxx ?–2024	Vaughan, Ontario, Canada	Inactive	
1242	Pomona Valley	19xx ?–19xx ?; November 16, 1965		Active	
1273	Base		Miami, Florida	Active	
1281	G'varim		Los Altos, California	Active	
1281	G'varim		Mountain View, California	Active	
1287	Albert Einstein		St. Louis, Missouri	Active	
1298	David Klein Shalom B'ahava		Albuquerque, New Mexico	Active	
1302	Woodcrest		Cherry Hill, New Jersey	Active	
1329	Isadore Shapiro		Houston, Texas	Active	
1349	Port Washington		Port Washington, New York	Active	
1353	Pascack Valley		Washington Township, Morris County, New Jersey	Active	
1372	Exodus		Woodbridge, Connecticut	Active	
1488	House of David		San Jose, California	Active	
1510	Chaim Weizmann		Omaha, Nebraska	Active	
1512	New Frontier		East Meadow, New York	Active	
1519	Brandeis		Potomac, Maryland	Active	
1521	Douglas Loeb		Houston, Texas	Active	
1545	Legacy		Syosset, New York	Active	
1550	Rainier		Seattle, Washington	Active	
1582	Tikvah		Armonk, New York	Active	
1582	Tikvah		Chappaqua, New York	Active	
1582	Tikvah		Mount Kisco, New York	Active	
1631	Robert F. Kennedy		Phoenix, Arizona	Active	
1646	Weprin/Kadima		Dayton, Ohio	Active	
1656	Samson		Commack, New York	Active	
1690	Madlik		Arlington, Virginia	Active	
1709	Saul Nahum		Raleigh, North Carolina	Active	
1850	Madhim		Scarsdale, New York	Active	
1855	Rabbi Morris Adler		Saratoga, California	Active	
1856	Wayne		Wayne, New Jersey	Active	
1882	Jack Entratter		Las Vegas, Nevada	Active	
1887	Machar		Foster City, California	Active	
1887	Machar		San Mateo, California	Active	
1900	Sababa		Holliston, Massachusetts	Active	
1912	Hatikoah		Montreal, Quebec, Canada	Inactive	
1929	Golden Gate		San Francisco, California	Active	
1935	Randy Reisbord		Houston, Texas	Active	
1938	Shazam		Pittsburgh, Pennsylvania	Active	
1943	Hatmadah		Lafayette Hills, Pennsylvania	Active	
1946	Berry-Erani		Newton, Massachusetts	Active	
1951	Alophim		Winnipeg, Manitoba, Canada	Active	
1974	Albert Einstein		Boca Raton, Florida	Active	
2043	Atz' Chaim		San Jose, California	Active	
2068	MS Manalapan		Manalapan, New Jersey	Active	
2076	Samson		Cleveland, Ohio	Active	
2092	Jack Lubel		Houston, Texas	Active	
2134	Einstein		Rockville, Maryland	Active	
2143	David Ben Gurion		Danville, California	Active	
2149	Marlcrest		Cherry Hill, New Jersey	Active	
2196	Gottlieb		Bridgeport, Connecticut	Active	
2233	Frank Fierman		Dunwoody, Georgia	Active	
2233	Frank Fierman		Sandy Springs, Georgia	Active	
2236	Abba Godol		Tucson, Arizona	Active	
2260	Exodus		Jericho, New York	Active	
2265	Chalutzim		Tampa, Florida	Active	
2283	Rabbi Meir Reznikoff		Phoenix, Arizona	Active	
2286	Hills		Dix Hills, New York	Active	
2291	Koach		Cedarvale, Toronto, Ontario, Canada	Active	
2300	Chazak		Oceanside, New York	Active	
2324	Zion		Five Towns, New York	Active	
2329	Drew Corson		Louisville, Kentucky	Active	
2338	Marlboro		Marlboro, New Jersey	Active	
2342	Shabak	December 2, 2021	Northbrook, Illinois	Active	
2357	Jonas Salk	May 22, 1985	Scottsdale, Arizona	Active	
2360	Magen		Toronto, Ontario, Canada	Active	
2361	L'chaim		Livingston, New Jersey	Active	
2370	Charles Schusterman		Boca Raton, Florida	Active	
2379	Haganah		Evanston, Illinois	Active	
2379	Haganah		Skokie, Illinois	Active	
2379	Haganah		Wilmette, Illinois	Active	
2383	Avi	xxxx ?–2006	Atlanta, Georgia area	Consolidated (Avitz)	(Note: Amitz (2490) and Avi (2383) consolidated to form Avitz (2383/2490).)
2387	Leviticus		Stamford, Connecticut	Active	
2388	Ruach	1987	Brooklyn, New York	Active	
2389	Alan Soifert		Sharon, Massachusetts	Active	
2411	Abraham Cristall		Edmonton, Alberta, Canada	Active	
2417	Masada		Merrick, New York	Active	
2424	Maccabees		Bellerose, New York	Active	
2425	Exodus		Cleveland, Ohio	Active	
2433	Genesis		Cleveland, Ohio	Inactive	
2434	Nivayim		Milwaukee, Wisconsin	Active	
2440	Masada		Cherry Hill, New Jersey	Active	
2444	Solomon		Milwaukee, Wisconsin	Active	
2453	Miami Beach		Miami Beach, Florida	Active	
2458	Hazakah	August 1993	Marietta, Georgia	Active	
2460	Gever		West Hills, California	Active	
2461	Melech	May 23, 1994	Gaithersburg, Maryland	Active	
2463	Chaim Hazaz		Eugene, Oregon	Active	
2469	Dave Hochman		East Greenwich, Rhode Island	Active	
2480	Mysteria		Davie, Florida	Active	
2481	Esperanto		St. Louis, Missouri	Active	
2486	Leviticus		Flushing, New York	Active	
2490	Amitz	xxxx ?–2006	Atlanta, Georgia area	Consolidated (Avitz)	
2383/2490	Avitz	2006	Sandy Springs, Georgia	Inactive	
2495	Ema Shelcha		Westlake, California	Active	
2501	Erich Weiss		San Antonio, Texas	Active	
2510	Golan		Coral Springs, Florida	Active	
2511	Knesset		Sherman Oaks, California	Active	
2519	Gideon		Reisterstown, Maryland	Active	
2524	Simon Wiesenthal		Palo Alto, California	Active	
2524	Simon Wiesenthal		Los Angeles, California	Active	
2525	Driedel		Oakland, California	Active	
2530	Tapuach		Palm Beach, Florida	Active	
2534	Monarchs		Richmond, Virginia	Active	
2538	Abraham Zelmanowitz		Alpharetta, Georgia	Active	
2538	Abraham Zelmanowitz		Johns Creek, Georgia	Active	
2539	Lantos		Potomac, Maryland	Active	
2539	Liviu Librescu	2008	Fairfax County, Virginia	Active	
2541	Ruach		Pittsburgh, Pennsylvania	Active	
2548	Capital		Austin, Texas	Active	
2552	Max Cowan		Columbia, Maryland	Active	
2553	Ometz	2012	Buffalo Grove, Illinois	Active	
2554	Barak		Boynton Beach, Florida	Active	
2557	Kol Ram		Atlanta, Georgia	Active	
2558	Mossad		Scarsdale, New York	Active	
2560	Negev		Naples, Florida	Active	
2561	Palmach		Chicago, Illinois	Active	
2562	Yitzhak Rabin		Bryn Mawr, Pennsylvania	Active	
2564	Empire		New York City, New York	Active	
2566	Hazak		Weston, Florida	Active	
2568	Leo Frank		Atlanta, Georgia	Active	
2569	Dekel Swissa		Atlanta, Georgia	Active	
60104	Hank Greenberg		North Farmington, North Carolina	Active	
	Barney Ross		Flossmoor, Illinois	Inactive	
	Barney Ross		Homewood, Illinois	Inactive	
	Barney Ross		Olympia Fields, Illinois	Inactive	
			Chelsea, Massachusetts	Inactive	
			Everett, Massachusetts	Inactive	
			Marblehead, Massachusetts	Inactive	
			Swampscott, Massachusetts	Inactive	
			Mattapan, Massachusetts	Inactive	
	Bucks County		Bucks County, Pennsylvania	Colony	
	CJBL		Cleveland, Ohio	Colony	
	East Brunswick		East Brunswick, New Jersey	Colony	
	Emerald City		Seattle, Washington	Colony	
	Glen Rock		Fair Lawn, New Jersey	Colony	
	Glen Rock		Glen Rock, New Jersey	Colony	
	Glen Rock		Ridgewood, New Jersey	Colony	
	Harrison		Harrison, New York	Colony	
	John F. Kennedy		St. Louis, Missouri	Colony	
	Miami Beach		Miami Beach, Florida	Colony	
	Montreal		Montreal, Quebec, Canada	Colony	
	West Essex		Caldwell, New Jersey	Colony	
	Zion		Aventura, Florida	Colony	
