= B'nai B'rith Camp =

B'nai B'rith Camp may refer to:

- B'nai B'rith Beber Camp
- B'nai B'rith Perlman Camp
