= Camp Pine (Illinois) =

Military installation in Des Plaines, Illinois, USA

- Des Plaines, Illinois, Cook County, Illinois

Site information
- Type: Work Camp; Farm Labor Camp; Prisoner of War Camp
- Controlled by: U.S. Army; U.S. Department of Agriculture

Location
- Coordinates: 42°04′45″N 87°53′16″W

Site history
- Built: 1934
- In use: 1934–1942 C.C.C. 1943–1944 U.S.D.A. 1945–1946 Army

Camp Pine was a Civilian Conservation Corps camp in Des Plaines, Illinois, north of Chicago. It was leased by the United States Department of Agriculture during World War II to house civilian farm workers from 1943 to 1944. The camp then housed German prisoners of war from 1945 to 1946. Its site is found in Camp Pine Woods forest preserve.

== History ==
=== Civilian Conservation Corps ===
A Civilian Conservation Corps (CCC) camp was established along the Des Plaines River at Dam No. 2 on Cook County Forest Preserve District property, north of Des Plaines, on August 16, 1934. Workers assigned to the camp were tasked with improving the local forest preserves by building parking spaces, shelters, trails, and other facilities. The camp was known as Camp Des Plaines and as Dam No. 2 Camp. It was abandoned by 1942.

=== Department of Agriculture ===
In June 1943, the Cook County Forest Preserve District leased the vacant CCC facilities near Des Plaines to the Extension Service of the U.S. Department of Agriculture. The camp housed civilian farm workers brought in to help farmers in northern Cook County in need of laborers. Workers imported from the British West Indies, along with teenaged male youths from the Victory Farm Volunteers program, lived at the camp intermittingly until late 1944.

A social experiment was conducted at the camp by a joint collaboration between several Chicago area Jewish organizations, including B'nai B'rith, Aleph Zadik Aleph, and the Chicago Board of Education. These intuitions used the former CCC camp near Des Plaines as a youth camp for Jewish boys from Chicago, while simultaneously exposing them to food production as paid workers of the Victory Farm Volunteers. The youth camp was called Camp Avodah and operated in Des Plaines for the summers of 1943 and 1944.

=== Prisoners of war ===
A contingent of 81 German prisoners of war from Fort Sheridan arrived in April 1945. The camp was renamed Camp Pine and was in operation until March 1946. The prisoners worked on local farms and for small businesses.
