= B'nai B'rith Beber Camp =

Summer camp in Wisconsin, United States

Coordinates: 42°50′08″N 88°23′13″W

B'nai B'rith Beber Camp is a 340-acre Jewish summer camp in Mukwonago, Wisconsin. Formerly known as Burr Oaks prior to B'nai B'rith's acquisition on 17 May 1976, it was named in honor of Sam Beber, the founder of Aleph Zadik Aleph, in August of that year as B'nai B'rith Beber Camp.

== Youth Camp ==
For years, there has been a camp for young campers at B'nai B'rith Beber Camp.

== BBYO Leadership Training ==
As BBYO was expanding its leadership training programs in the summer at B'nai B'rith Perlman Camp in the 1970s, they sought a new location for a new two-week program that would “make the experience long enough to be meaningful and short enough to hold down costs for the participants.” With this new program, BBYO would hope to re-emphasize its “strong trend toward in-depth training in leadership skills and in Judaism.”

Because of increasing and maximum enrollment at BBPC, the new Chapter Leadership Training Program began at B'nai B'rith Beber Camp in 1977 (BBBC), its name later changing to Chapter Leadership Training Conference (CLTC). 1980 marked the first year that CLTC expanded to two sessions, eventually growing into more.
