= Philip Klutznick =

American politician (1907–1999)

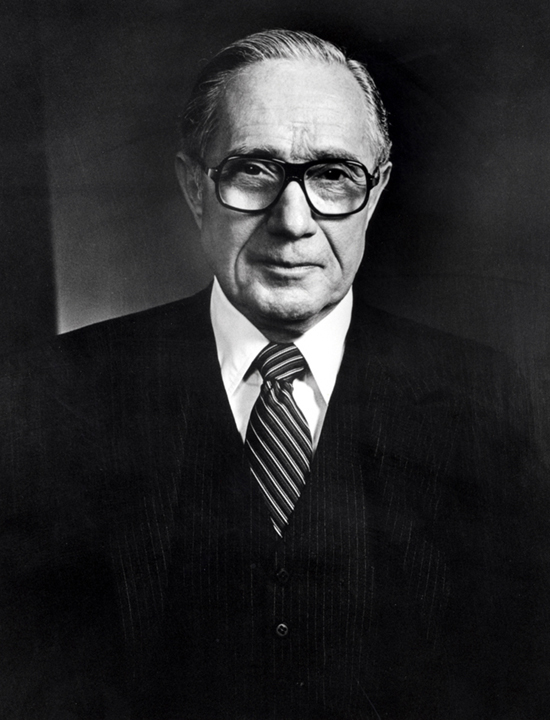

25th United States Secretary of Commerce
- In office January 9, 1980 – January 19, 1981
- President: Jimmy Carter
- Preceded by: Juanita M. Kreps
- Succeeded by: Malcolm Baldrige Jr.

President of the World Jewish Congress
- In office 1977–1979
- Preceded by: Nahum Goldmann
- Succeeded by: Edgar Bronfman

2nd Grand Aleph Godol of Aleph Zadik Aleph
- In office 1925–1926
- Preceded by: Charles Shane
- Succeeded by: Jacob Fink

Personal details
- Born: Philip Morris Klutznick; July 9, 1907 Kansas City, Missouri, U.S.
- Died: August 14, 1999 (aged 92) Chicago, Illinois, U.S.
- Party: Democratic
- Spouse: Ethel Riekes (m. 1930; died 1996)
- Children: 6
- Education: University of Kansas, Lawrence; University of Nebraska; Creighton University (LLB)

Philip Morris Klutznick (July 9, 1907 – August 14, 1999) was a U.S. administrator who served as U.S. Secretary of Commerce from January 9, 1980, to January 19, 1981, under President Jimmy Carter. He was a prominent leader of several Jewish organisations, including as president of the World Jewish Congress from 1977 to 1979.

== Early life ==
Klutznick was born on July 9, 1907, in Kansas City, Missouri, the son of Morris and Minnie Klutznick, who had emigrated from Russian Poland two years earlier. In 1924, Klutznick participated in the formation of the second chapter of the Jewish fraternal youth organization Aleph Zadik Aleph (AZA). He became the 2nd Grand Aleph Godol (International Teen President) of the expanding organization in 1925. After high school, he became the first executive director of AZA.

He attended the University of Kansas at Lawrence and the University of Nebraska and received an LL.B. degree in 1930 from Creighton University in Omaha, Nebraska. After school, he worked as an attorney and became involved in housing construction. During World War II, he was responsible for building homes for defense workers in the eastern United States including the construction of the residential town of Oak Ridge, Tennessee, where parts of the atomic bomb were being developed in the Manhattan Project. After the war, he built suburban shopping malls in the Chicago area in partnership with the Chicago department store chain, Marshall Field & Company.

== Career ==
Klutznick's career in public service advanced along with his success in business. After World War II, he joined American Community Developers to create Park Forest, a suburb south of Chicago. In 1953, he was elected to the first of two three-year terms as president of B'nai B'rith. His presidency focused on strengthening the century-old organization's internal structure and expanding its constituency. He visited B'nai B'rith districts worldwide and worked to strengthen lodges in post-war Europe and Israel. Domestically, he instituted a membership drive, expanded support for youth programs and travelled in the Southern United States to discuss B'nai B'rith support for school desegregation and the growing civil rights movement.

Klutznick was also active in international affairs. In 1957, he served a three-month term as a United Nations delegate. He gained the rank of ambassador as US representative on the UN Economic and Social Council in 1960, working closely with United States Ambassador to the United Nations Adlai Stevenson II. Klutznick resigned his UN post two years later, contending that a failure to integrate political goals with economic and social needs undermined the effectiveness of international diplomacy. In later years, he remained active in international affairs, completing a survey of Brazilian housing for the Johnson administration, writing and speaking frequently on international issues and working with the United Nations Association of the United States of America.

Klutznick had a special interest in the Middle East and in Israel–United States relations. As B'nai B'rith president, he travelled to Israel and advocated the use of German reparations funds to support Jewish organizations. He was among the American Jewish leaders to meet with President Dwight D. Eisenhower's Secretary of State John Foster Dulles to discuss Middle Eastern policy and events. In 1977, Klutznick became president of the World Jewish Congress, succeeding Nahum Goldmann who had led the group since 1949. During negotiations that preceded the 1977 Camp David Accords, Klutznick met with Israeli leader Menachem Begin, Egyptian President Anwar Sadat, and Jimmy Carter, as well as other US administration officials. In 1978, Klutznick initiated a commission headed by Guy de Rothschild to examine the economic implications of Arab-Israeli peace for Israel and the international Jewish community. Another focus of his leadership was Jewish culture, demonstrated in efforts to strengthen and reorganize the Memorial Foundation for Jewish Culture and Beit Hatfutsot, the museum of the Jewish diaspora. Klutznick's service as WJC President was brief. He took a leave of absence upon his confirmation vote as Secretary of Commerce in 1979, and chose to leave the position to his replacement, Edgar Bronfman, Sr, after leaving the government.

Klutznick's views on Middle Eastern issues were often controversial in the American and international Jewish communities. He considered himself a Zionist, and a strong defender of Israel, but encouraged dialogue with Arab groups and leaders. In 1975, he served on a "Middle East Study Group", sponsored by the Brookings Institution, which produced a report encouraging both Israeli and Arab concessions and active involvement by the US government. In 1981, he travelled to Israel, Saudi Arabia, Jordan, Syria, Egypt and the West Bank as part of a private group to meet with leaders in government, education, military affairs, business and communications, as well as political dissidents. The resulting "Seven Springs Report" attempted to provide a base of knowledge and understanding for the conduct of future negotiations and peace plans. In June 1982, Klutznick joined with Nahum Goldmann, former president of the World Jewish Congress, and Pierre Mendès France, former prime minister of France, to issue the "Paris Declaration", encouraging an end to Israel's siege of Beirut and negotiation with the Palestine Liberation Organization (PLO) to ensure regional peace and security. Klutznick's involvement in each of these reports and statements prompted both widespread support and protest from Jewish organizations and individuals.

In January 1980, Klutznick began service as U.S. Secretary of Commerce under 39th President Jimmy Carter. He took office at the age of 72, making him the oldest first-time appointee to cabinet in U.S. history. That record was broken in 2017 when Wilbur Ross became Secretary of Commerce at the age of 79. Klutznick had long-standing relationships with Vice-President Walter Mondale and U.S. Secretary of State, Cyrus Vance and his ties to the Carter administration were further strengthened by his significant role in Arab-Israeli peace talks. His appointment was viewed by some critics as an effort to strengthen Carter's status among Jewish voters. Klutznick's tenure was marked by the economic recession and inflation that characterized the later years of the Carter administration, Carter's unsuccessful bid for re-election, and the completion of the 1980 census.

In 1981 and 1982, Klutznick served as the Wayne Morse Chair of Law and Politics, established in honor of the late former Senator, at the University of Oregon.

== Personal life ==
Klutznick married Ethel Riekes in 1930. They had six children, Bettylu, Richard, who died in early childhood, Thomas, James, Robert and Samuel. Ethel Klutznick died in 1996. Philip M. Klutznick died of Alzheimer's disease on August 14, 1999.

Klutznick was part of an investment group led by Arthur M. Wirtz that purchased the Chicago Bulls on 25 July 1972 and sold controlling interest in the franchise to Jerry Reinsdorf on 8 February 1985.

His daughter, Bettylu Saltzman, is widely credited with helping launch President Barack Obama's political career. She introduced the then-community organizer to David Axelrod in 1992.

== See also ==
- List of Jewish United States Cabinet members

Political offices
Preceded by Juanita M. Kreps	U.S. Secretary of Commerce; Served under: Jimmy Carter; January 9, 1980 – January 19, 1981	Succeeded by Malcolm Baldrige Jr.
