= Camp Airy =

Boys Jewish sleep away summer camp

- Serving Jewish Youth For Over 100 Summers
- Type: Overnight Camp
- Established: 1924
- Affiliations: Camp Louise
- Camp Director: Rob Hiken
- Location: 14938 Old Camp Airy Road; Thurmont, MD 21788, Thurmont, Maryland, United States; 39°38′40″N 77°25′16″W
- Campus: 450 acres (1.8 km^{2})
- Colors: green and white
- Website: Camp Airy/Louise website

Camp Airy is a Jewish sleep away summer camp located in Thurmont, Maryland at the edge of Catoctin Mountain Park. Boys between the ages of 7 and 17 attend for one to seven weeks, depending on their age and interest. Airy is a fully accredited member of the American Camp Association. Camp Airy is the brother camp to Camp Louise.

== History ==
Camp Airy was founded in 1924 by Aaron and Lillie Straus, philanthropists from Baltimore. One of the early figures in the camp history was Sidney Chernak, who started as a counselor and continued as director of Airy and executive director of Airy and Louise. In 1990, Sid Chernak retired after 63 summers spent at camp Airy. Edwin "Ed" Cohen took over as director of Camp Airy. Cohen, who referred to Chernak as "a father," created the legacy of a "camp family". Cohen died on June 21, 2014.

A large fire destroyed the "White House" dining hall on June 29, 2022, as camp was in session. There were no injuries. A new dining hall has since been built and is now operational.

=== Religious aspects ===
Camp Airy is a camp for Jewish boys. The meals are kosher style, meaning that dairy and meat are not served at the same time and nothing that is explicitly non-kosher (such as pork) is served. Each meal begins with the recitation of Ha'motzi – The prayer over bread. Traditional grace after meals is also recited on Saturdays.

Shabbat is observed at camp with short services on Friday night and Saturday morning. A special day is created to provide a change of pace during the remainder of Saturday. This "day of rest" creates a certain rhythm that helps punctuate the camp experience. Shabbat concludes with a Havdallah service at night.

=== People ===
Many of the people who work at the camp are referred to as "Lifers". For Airy, this includes early "lifers" such as Sidney Chernak and Ed Cohen, and current "lifers" Rick Frankle, Doctors Danny and David Framm, and Mike Schneider. While some of these "Lifers" are no longer a part of the daily running of Camp Airy, most can be found "on the hill" each and every season. Rick Frankle is the most recent past Director of the camp. Frankle is a former camper, CIT, and counselor at the Camp, and his mother served as a nurse there for many years. Joining him in 2010 was Assistant Director Scott Black, a former camper, CIT, and counselor. Returning to camp in 2014 was another "lifer," Marty Rochlin. Marty was a former camper, CIT, Counselor, Unit Leader and Assistant Director who took over as the year round director of Camp Airy at the end of the Summer of 2014. As Rochlin became director, Black left his position of assistant director, with longtime staff member Jason Creger taking his position. Last year, over 90 percent of the staff had been at Camp Airy the year before.

== Programming ==
Airy offers many traditional summer camp activities including Athletics, outdoor living, swimming, performing arts and fine arts.

Athletics are a critical part of the summer camp experience. Campers play baseball, basketball, football, lacrosse, soccer, floor hockey, tennis, and volleyball. Many also participate in in-line skating, fencing and wrestling. The camp also has an archery range. In past years the camp offered a riflery program, although that has since been discontinued.

The Drama department typically produces two plays in a Summer, the first a musical production, and the second a straight play. There are also opportunities for people who play musical instruments or enjoy singing to perform.

In the fine arts department, campers are offered activities in ceramics, painting, silk-screening, copper enamel, hemp and beads, photography, and wood working among others.

Recently the camp has begun to add non-traditional features such as a skateboard park, Scuba diving, paintballing, go-carts and dune buggies.

=== CIT program ===
The CIT (Counselor in Training) program is one of Camp Airy's best distinguishing features. It is a program held for campers who will be entering their senior year of high school after camp that focuses on both teaching campers how to transition into becoming counselors and developing strong bonds between fellow CITs. The program provides continuity between counselor classes summer after summer and allows campers to transition smoothly into counselors without having to leave camp for even one summer. The CIT program can also be credited with causing counselor retention to be so high at Airy. CIT traditions and programs include many bonding activities, riding White Wolf buses, bunk and department experiences, a CIT havdalah service, CIT T-shirts, and a frequent leadership training course.

== Facilities ==
Located on 450 heavily treed acres, the camp is located 60 miles (97 km) north of Washington and 62 miles (100 km) west of Baltimore.

Down-hill camp includes the large Chernak gym, complete with basketball courts and a wrestling area. There's also a 300,000 gallon swimming pool, featuring a small basketball hoop, several floating pool balls, and an Aquaclimb. Also, there are athletic fields, tennis courts, a floor hockey rink, and a ropes course.

At the top of the hill, there was a 550-seat dining hall (which was destroyed in a June 29, 2022, fire), where campers eat each of their meals. That building has now been replaced with an air-conditioned dining hall that can accommodate over 600 people. Nearby are the music pavilion and the post office. All of the sleeping cabins are also up-hill, and on the far western side is the outdoor theater which is used for performing arts, shabbat services, and various events during Olympics (Game show, Human Anagrams, etc.).

== Notable alumni ==
- Benny Blanco – American record producer, DJ, songwriter, record executive, and actor
- Marc Roberge and Chris Culos from the band O.A.R.
- Jacob Glushakow
- Hugo Weisgall
- Alan Schneider
- Mark Versallion
- Carl Bernstein
- Aaron Frazer – Vocalist and Drummer for Durand Jones & The Indications
- Dan Kolko
