= Juanita M. Kreps =

American economist (1921–2010)

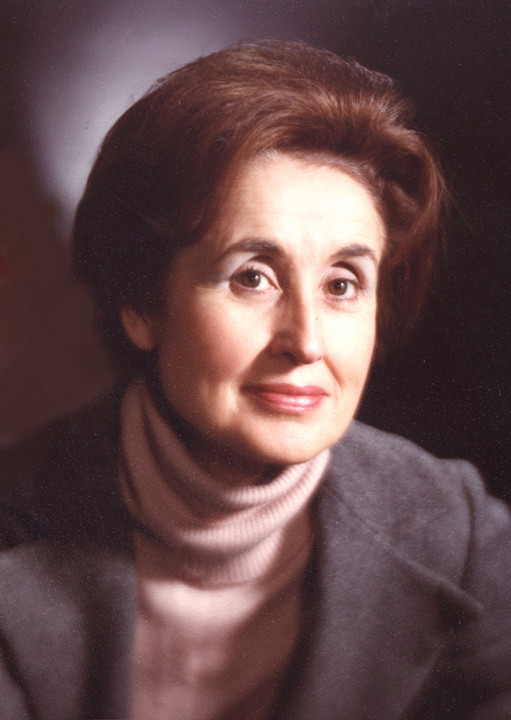

24th United States Secretary of Commerce
- In office January 23, 1977 – October 31, 1979
- President: Jimmy Carter
- Preceded by: Elliot Richardson
- Succeeded by: Philip Klutznick

Personal details
- Born: Clara Juanita Morris; January 11, 1921 Lynch, Kentucky, U.S.
- Died: July 5, 2010 (aged 89) Durham, North Carolina, U.S.
- Party: Democratic
- Spouse: Clifton Kreps
- Children: 3
- Education: Berea College (BA); Duke University (MA, PhD)

Clara Juanita Morris Kreps (January 11, 1921 – July 5, 2010) was an American economist, educator and businesswoman who served as the 24th United States secretary of commerce under President Jimmy Carter from 1977 to 1979. A member of the Democratic Party, Kreps was the first woman to hold that post and the fourth female ever to serve in a presidential cabinet (alongside simultaneously appointed HUD Secretary Patricia Roberts Harris).

== Early life and career ==
Kreps was born Clara Juanita Morris on January 11, 1921, in Lynch, Kentucky. She was the daughter of Cenia (née Blair) and Elmer M. Morris. She graduated from Berea College in 1942, and earned her master's and Ph.D. in economics at Duke University in 1944 and 1948, respectively. She was inducted into Phi Beta Kappa. A specialist in labor demographics, Kreps taught at Denison University, Hofstra College, Queens College, and Duke. She rose through the ranks there to become the university's first female vice president. In 1972 she was the first woman director of the New York Stock Exchange.

== Family background ==
Living in Harlan County, Kreps was raised in a part of Kentucky known for its coal mining industry. Coming from a family of mostly farmers on her mother's side which continued through her mother's adulthood, Kreps' father was initially an accountant for the coal mining business, later he moved up to be the manager of a small, independent coal mine. When Kreps was young her parents divorced. Her father lived close by to lessen the impact of divorced parents. Kreps had five siblings: one older sister and four brothers. Though her mother continued farming through her adulthood, her father sent monthly alimony payments to help Kreps and her siblings survive.

== Education ==
Around age twelve, Kreps was sent to boarding school at the now defunct Stuart Robinson School joining the class of 1938. Her education was largely paid for by the Presbyterian Church. Teachers at her boarding school came from all over the South and the education she was receiving at the time was highly esteemed. Her high school counselors tried to steer her towards going to Berea College, which was a free institution, or other Presbyterian colleges like Flora McDonald. However, Kreps' financial situation restricted her from schools with high tuition and made the cheaper options more viable.

Kreps attended Berea College in the late 1930s into the 1940s and Kreps noted that the national atmosphere had changed. Her college days were driven by equality motivated philosophies and the idea that gender and race did not divide anyone intellectually. At Berea, Kreps worked as a dishwasher, a college hospital receptionist, a theater department costume designer and finally as an aide to one of the top Economics professors in the department as a paper grader. Through her connections with Rector Hardin, a professor who had received a Ph.D. from Duke himself, Kreps was able to attend graduate school at Duke University. One of her mentors at Duke was Frank Deviyver. Over the years as student, Kreps helped edit his book and she wrote her dissertation under Deviyver's supervision. Kreps attributed her ability to continue her education with less discrimination during her college years because she was not a man. At the time, men were being drafted for war and women were not, which Kreps noted made it more possible for her to teach almost directly after graduating seeing as no men were around to tell her not to. Teaching at this time, Kreps realized most of her students were women with some men scattered here and there.

First meeting her husband in Atlanta while working with the National War Labor Board in 1943, she later reconnected with him while he was also doing his Ph.D. at Duke University. That summer, Kreps and her husband worked as wage analysts who were in charge of trying to stop inflation and ensure that wage increases were not increasing too rapidly.

== Marital teaching career ==
During the mid-1940s, Kreps and her husband had faced many obstacles in terms of managing to match up with their appointments. Both of them managed to get teaching jobs in Ohio but at two different colleges. Their relationship consisted of seeing each other very sparsely and when Kreps' husband got offered a position in California at Pomona College in 1950, Kreps used this time to herself to finish her dissertation. Eventually the two returned to Ohio for a few years until her husband was offered a position with the Federal Reserve Bank in New York in the mid-1950s and at this point in their life is when children became Kreps' main focus.

== Working mother in the 1950s ==
During her time as a child bearer, Kreps never maintained a full-time position. During the 1950s, Kreps believed it would be too difficult to juggle the responsibilities of motherhood on top of being part of the full-time labor force. With her time away from full-time appointments, Kreps managed to edit a few books but other than that was very distant from the work force. Kreps' husband eventually left his position in New York to pursue a position at the University of North Carolina. Knowing that her family was being moved to Chapel Hill, Duke University reached out and offered Kreps a job teaching a few classes. As her children got older, Kreps started to take on more and more responsibility as a professor with Duke and gained entry back into the world of full-time appointment.

As a mother, Kreps was satisfied and grateful for her time away from the workforce. However, as a woman, she did note that her six to eight years away for reproductive leave did stifle her in terms of achievement in comparison to other women around her age. She appreciated the time she got to write while being home for those years.

== Feminist Movement supporter ==
As an early advocate of the feminist movement, Kreps attended events and publicly supported equal opportunity employment on numerous occasions. Through teaching, Kreps was able to try and instill more than just the life of a homemaker and teach all her students that women were entitled to a fulfilling occupation just as much as men were.

Kreps' appointment to Secretary of Commerce under President Jimmy Carter was a historic moment for the movement. People had been publicly questioning how qualified women were to hold cabinet positions and even the president himself was guilty of making assumptions on the topic. Kreps is very well known for her reaction to this assumption where she told the president "You have to look harder for qualified women."

While working at Duke University, Kreps was promoted to dean of the Women's College. In her time working there, she noticed that after a while the college was faced with too much pressure to combine with the rest of the campus and that women were not particularly inclined to enjoy how segregated from the rest of their own campus they were. At first, Kreps was very cautious of the position since she could visibly see how much more progressive women on the campus were becoming. Though the college did want a new dean, Kreps was very much aware her administration would be marked by the integration of the Woman's College into the whole of campus and that her position of leadership at the college would be one of short standing.

Eventually, Kreps resigned from her position as dean in 1972. This decision came for many reasons, but one specific one that she cited in her resignation letter was that she did not want to interfere with the progress that the school was making in terms of integrating the Woman's College. She knew that by remaining in her position she would be standing in the way of the basic rebuilding of the undergraduate experience and though it may not have been ideal she knew it was a necessary next step. At this point, Kreps knew she had other aspirations and that the change was coming with or without her. Following this resignation, Kreps returned to teaching Economics and was given the position of Vice President of Duke in 1973 until 1977 just a couple years later. Later she received the James B. Duke Professorship which Kreps was awarded to her for her years of research, publications and professional experience.

== Woman of firsts ==
In addition to being the first female Secretary of Commerce, Kreps also became the first female director of the New York Stock Exchange in 1972. She served on various corporate boards: AT&T, Armco, Chrysler, Citicorp, JCPenney, John Deere, Kodak, RJR Nabisco, UAL Corporation and Zurn Industries. In 1987, Kreps became the first woman to win the Director of the Year award for the National Association of Corporate Directors (NACD). Kreps efforts in the boardroom were seen as nothing less than "gold standard". She believed it was the job of those in the boardrooms to raise awareness by what they chose to discuss: "The trouble isn't whether you have the courage to raise the issues. Where you might fall down in your obligation to stockholders is in not knowing enough about what's going on to make an intelligent decision."

== Cabinet appointment ==
Before her appointment in the Carter administration, Kreps had never worked in a government position. During her appointment, Kreps faced numerous issues in terms of adjusting to a government level occupation. Kreps faced budgeting issues and struggled to work with other Cabinet members who did not take her seriously since she was a woman. She also had to manage a good relationship with Congress which was nearly all male. Kreps still felt close to Carter regardless and enjoyed a friendly relationship with the president. Political advisor Anne Wexler, who was serving on the President Jimmy Carter's transition team after his victory in the 1976 presidential election, recommended Kreps for a post in the Carter administration. She was replaced by Philip M. Klutznick.

Kreps' time as a cabinet member was considered different not only because she was a woman but also because no economist had ever before held her cabinet position. However, during the Carter administration, Kreps had started out as a very important contributor to economic policy, and slowly people like the Secretary of the Treasury, the OMB director and the chief economist in the State Department, started to push her out of talks. Kreps attributed this to anti-Commerce Department segregation and later on was relieved to find that she disagreed with many of the decisions made by this small group and was thankful for having been overlooked. By the end, the meetings were inclusive and Kreps was offered virtually unlimited access to Carter, which she saw as good consolation for her peers' oversight.

Kreps was appointed to serve as the Secretary of Commerce. She resigned on October 31, 1979.

Kreps worked heavily on trade issues during her appointment. One of her biggest accomplishments as a cabinet member was noted as the trade agreement with China. The agreement was a public works program and it was started in her first year on the job. Kreps facilitated a successful bill associated with the Arab boycott during her appointment as well. Kreps made it very clear that the U.S. was not particularly savvy in regard to the world economy. To form successful relations with other countries, like Japan, Kreps believed that the U.S. needed to appreciate the other countries for what they were and to stop trying to force free trade on places that have different kinds of governments.

== Policy ==
Kreps wrote a report in 1976 called "Social Security in the Coming Decade: Questions for a Mature System". The report examined Social Security as a whole and its feasibility. The report began with a quote that Kreps herself agreed with in regard to Social Security policies: "There is really no way to support retired Americans comfortably and affordably." The conclusion of the report found that increased interest in where Social Security is going by the general public is what will keep retirement benefits alive. The people must stay invested in knowing where funding for Social Security is coming from and staying vigilant of the number of new people reaching retirement eligibility each year to ensure a working system.

During her time as Secretary of Commerce, Kreps brought proposal to the Department of Health, Education, and Welfare which stated that the age for Social Security eligibility must be raised gradually otherwise the benefits will deplete at too quick of a rate. This was immediately followed by a lot of opposition because Americans did not want to have work any longer than they believe was required of them. Her reasoning came from the fact that from her calculations the only way to keep Social Security funds at an adequate level, her solution needed to be implemented over a set course of years. Though her vision came a little bit early, eventually the government did exactly what Kreps suggested in order to save the sanctity of Social Security.

== Cultural depiction ==
Kreps is played by Becky Ann Baker in the 2020 Amazon Studios streaming series Hunters.

== Personal life ==
On August 11, 1944, she married Clifton Holland Kreps Jr., a former professor at the University of North Carolina. They had two daughters and one son.

Kreps was awarded the 1976 North Carolina Award for public service and 20 honorary degrees. She sat on the board of 10 major corporations. A collection of Kreps' papers is housed at the Rubenstein Library at the Duke University.

Kreps died on July 5, 2010, in Durham, North Carolina, from complications of Alzheimer's disease at the age of 89. She was buried at the Chapel of the Cross Episcopal Churchyard in Chapel Hill, North Carolina.

== See also ==
- List of female United States Cabinet members

Political offices
Preceded by Elliot Richardson	United States Secretary of Commerce; 1977–1979	Succeeded by Philip Klutznick
