= Jacob Glushakow =

American painter

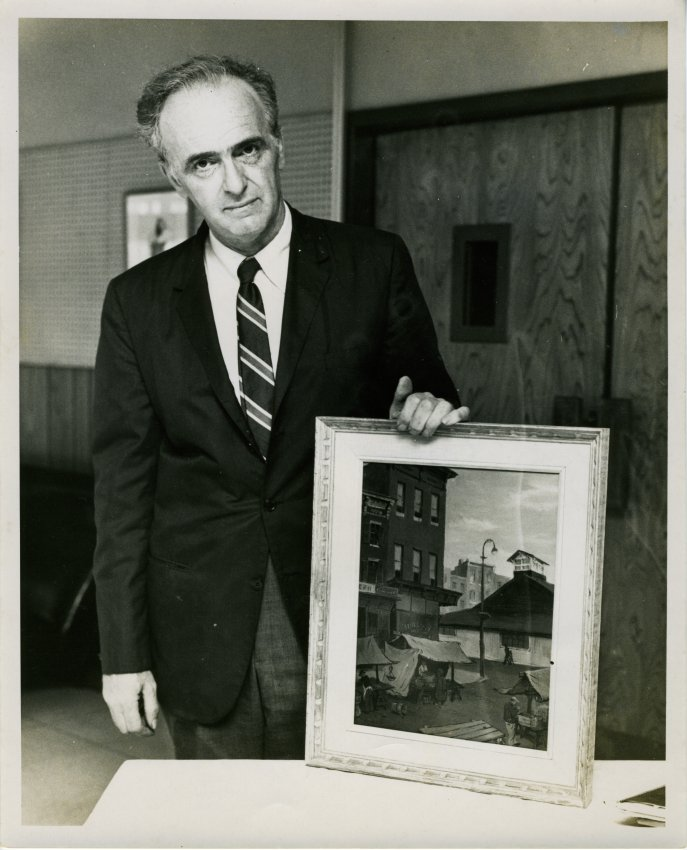
Black and white photograph of Jacob Glushakow, Chairman of JCC Art Committee. He is holding a painting on a table. The painting is a city scene, with small market stalls in front of a larger building. JMM 2006.13.1285

Jacob Glushakow (1914 – October 12, 2000) was an American painter known for his keen observations of life in the city of Baltimore, Maryland, United States.

== Background ==
Jacob Glushakow was the oldest of 11 children born to Esther and Abraham Glushakow. He was born on the steamship Brandenburg while crossing the Atlantic from Bremen to Baltimore. His father was a clothing presser and candy maker and was also the host of a Jewish-American radio program. Jacob's parents left Ukraine days before the outbreak of World War I.

Jacob was raised in East Baltimore at Eden and Baltimore streets and attended Baltimore City Public Schools. He graduated from the Baltimore City College high school in 1933 and went on to the Maryland Institute College of Art and the Art Students League in New York, where he studied from 1933 to 1936. During his time in New York he taught a children's art class at a public school in the Bronx as part of the Works Progress Administration project.

== Career ==
Glushakow spent more than sixty years painting the neighborhoods of his hometown. His works reflect an interest in the everyday, often including views of row houses, markets, streets. They provide a record of Baltimore's past, and feature a somewhat melancholic view of the urban setting with a rich history that has disappeared. Glushakow studied art at the Maryland Institute College of Art, the Jewish Educational Alliance, and at the Art Students League in New York. He remained faithful to a traditional realist style of painting throughout his career. His work can be found in the permanent collections of The Baltimore Museum of Art, The Phillips Collection, The Jewish Museum of Maryland, the Maryland Historical Society and the Metropolitan Museum of Art, among others.
