= Myron Sulzberger =

American lawyer and politician (1878–1956)

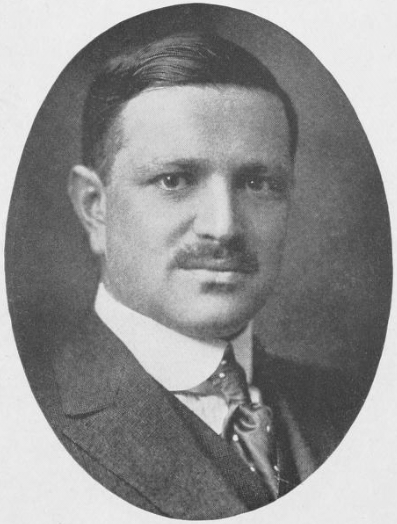

Member of the New York State Assembly from New York County's 26th District
- In office 1902–1903
- Preceded by: John J. O'Connell
- Succeeded by: Charles Leopold

Personal details
- Born: June 14, 1878 New York City, New York, U.S.
- Died: September 16, 1956 (aged 78) White Plains, New York, U.S.
- Party: Democratic
- Spouse: Rena Fuld
- Children: Myron Jr., Edward
- Education: College of the City of New York; New York Law School
- Profession: Lawyer, politician, judge

Myron Sulzberger (June 14, 1878 – September 16, 1956) was a Jewish-American lawyer, politician, and judge from New York.

== Early life and education ==
Myron Sulzberger was born on June 14, 1878, in New York City, New York, the son of Solomon Sulzberger and Esther Emden. His father was a German immigrant who served as president and treasurer of B'nai B'rith and vice-president of the Union of American Hebrew Congregations.

Sulzberger received his education in New York City public schools, followed by studies at the Weingart Institute. He completed a two-year course at the College of the City of New York and then attended New York Law School, where he was admitted to the state bar.

== Career ==
Sulzberger was active in the Democratic Party, beginning his political involvement by giving speeches before he was old enough to vote. In 1901, he was elected to the New York State Assembly as a Democrat, representing the New York County 26th District. He served in the Assembly in 1902 and 1903. While in the Assembly, he introduced and worked on several important legislative matters, particularly concerning insurance and canal propositions.

Sulzberger served as special deputy Attorney General of New York from 1904 to 1905 and as special counsel of the New York State Prison Commission from 1924 to 1927. In 1927, he became a Municipal Court Justice, a position he was re-elected to in 1937. He resigned in 1941 and returned to private practice. As Justice, he chaired the rules committee, which recommended establishing a separate civil jurisdiction for small claims, leading to the creation of the Small Claims Part of Magistrate's Court. After retiring from the bench, he specialized in corporate and real estate law with the firm Sulzberger, Schechter & Sulzberger, partnering with his son Myron Jr. and Jacob Schechter.

== Personal life ==
Sulzberger was president of the Mt. Vernon Country Club and chairman of the County Committee, 14th Assembly District, from 1920 to 1927. He also served on the advisory board of the Home of the Daughters of Jacob from 1927 onward and was a member of various organizations, including the American Bar Association, the New York State Bar Association, the New York County Lawyers' Association, the Federal Bar Association of the Southern District of New York, the Society of Tammany, the Michael T. McCarron Association, the Yorkville Chamber of Commerce, the New York Society for the Prevention of Cruelty to Children, the Museum of Art, the Museum of Natural History, the Cosmopolitan Association, the Freemasons, the Elks, the Knights of Pythias, B'nai B'rith, the Craftsmen of Yorkville Club, and the National Democratic Club. He attended Temple Emanu-El and was an honorary director of its Men's Club. In 1903, he married Rena Fuld, and they had two children, Myron Jr. and Edward.

== Death ==
Sulzberger died in White Plains General Hospital after a long illness on September 16, 1956.

New York State Assembly
Preceded by John J. O'Connell	New York State Assembly; New York County, 26th District; 1902–1903	Succeeded by Charles Leopold
