= Henry Monsky =

Jewish-American lawyer and communal leader (1890-1947)

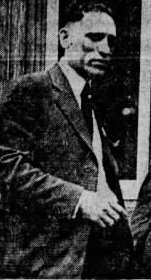

Henry Monsky (February 4, 1890 – May 2, 1947) was a Jewish-American lawyer and communal leader from Omaha, Nebraska.

== Life ==
Monsky was born on February 4, 1890, in Omaha, Nebraska, the son of fish dealer Abraham Monsky and Betsy Perisnev Greenblatt. His parents were Orthodox Jews who immigrated to America from Lithuania in the 1880s. His father was a cantor, and as a boy he went to cheder in addition to public schools.

Monsky graduated from high school in 1907. He then studied law at Creighton University School of Law, graduating from there cum laude with a LL.B. degree in 1912. He began practicing law in Omaha afterwards. By 1926, he was senior member of the law firm Monsky, Katleman & Grodinsky. A leader in local communal affairs, he was a founder of Omaha's Community Chest in 1922, continuously sat on its board, and served as its first vice-president and later as its president. He was an active collaborator with Father Edward J. Flanagan in developing Boys Town, possibly providing financial assistance so that Flanagan could pay the first month's rent for the settlement, and he was believed by one source to be the inspiration of Flanagan's Jewish friend in the movie Boys Town. He was also a director of the Omaha Chamber of Commerce, president of the Nebraska Conference of Social Work and the Omaha Council of Boy Scouts, and a member of the Omaha Welfare Fund.

Monsky joined the B'nai B'rith lodge in Omaha in 1911, and in 1913 he became the lodge's youngest president. In 1923, he was elected president of B'nai B'rith's 6th district, which consisted of several Midwestern states. He was elected to the national executive board in 1933, and in 1938 he became its international president. The first B'nai B'rith president to have an Eastern European and Orthodox background, he served as president until his death, more than doubled its membership, expanded its various programs, and served as chairman of virtually all of the national committees that supervised the program. His strong support for B'nai B'rith came from the organization not adhering to any political or religious dogma and welcoming all Jews. He was against the growing factionalism among American Jews to the point of refusing to identify with any one Jewish denomination, becoming a member of Reform, Conservative, and Orthodox congregations.

Monsky was an organizer of the General Jewish Council and became its vice-president in 1942. He became honorary chairman of the United Jewish Appeal and the United Palestine Appeal, serving as principal speaker of the latter's conventions from 1939 to 1942. He was an executive committee member of the National Refugee Service, the Joint Distribution Committee, the Council of Jewish Federations and Welfare Funds, and the American Association for Jewish Education. He was also an honorary advisory committee member of Youth Aliyah, honorary vice-president of the Jewish Publication Society of America, an honorary trustee of the Jewish Chautauqua Society, an Army and Navy Committee member of the National Jewish Welfare Board, and a member of the Jewish Committee on Boy Scouting. In 1941, President Franklin Roosevelt appointed him a member of the National Voluntary Participation Committee of the Office of Civilian Defense. In 1942, he received an honorary Doctor of Hebrew Letters degree from Dropsie College for Hebrew and Cognate Learning. One source described him as the first Nebraskan to become prominent in national Jewish affairs.

A lifelong Zionist, Monsky successfully enlisted non-Zionist support in protests against the White Paper of 1939, Cyprus internment camps, and restrictions on Jewish immigration to Mandatory Palestine. On December 8, 1942, he led a delegation of Jewish organization representatives to the White House and President Roosevelt to bring attention to the plight of European Jews and to request firm action against the Nazis. He collaborated with Zionists as the principal organizer of the all-inclusive American Jewish Conference in 1943, when the American Jewish community endorsed the Zionist program of a Jewish commonwealth. He was a consultant for the American delegation of the United Nations Conference on International Organization in 1945 and helped convince UN leaders to guarantee the rights of any state or people living under international bodies, including Mandatory Palestine. He testified before the Anglo-American Committee of Inquiry in 1946 in favor of that demand. An Israeli moshav, Ramat Tzvi, was named after him.

Monsky was a Republican. He was a member of the Dropsie College board of governors, the American Bar Association, the Nebraska State Bar Association, the Omaha Bar Association, the American Judicature Society, Zeta Beta Tau, the Freemasons, the Elks, and the Highland Country Club in Omaha. He was also executive committee chairman and continuing committee chairman of the U.S. Attorney General's National Conference for Prevention and Control of Juvenile Delinquency, editor of the National Jewish Monthly, and a contributor to welfare publications. In 1915, he married Sadie Lesser. Their children were Joy, Hubert, and Barbara. They divorced in the early 1930s. In 1937, he married Daisy Hirsch, a niece of Adolf Kraus and widow of Albert Rothschild. He fell in love with Daisy when he was young and planned to marry her, only for social and religious prejudices from both families to put a stop to the wedding.

Monsky died from a coronary thrombosis in a conference parlor at the Biltmore Hotel in New York City, New York, where he was presiding over an executive committee meeting for the American Jewish Conference (he was chairman of its Interim Committee), on May 2, 1947.

Over 2,000 people attended a special memorial service for him at Temple Emanu-El in New York City, including Bernard Baruch, Henry Morgenthau Jr., B'nai B'rith Veterans Committee chairman Col. Elliott Niles of Boston, New York Supreme Court Justice Meier Steinbrink, Women's Supreme Council of B'nai B'rith president Mrs. A. Orlow, Dropsie College president Abraham A. Neuman, former Municipal Court Justice Myron Sulzberger, B'nai B'rith national vice-president Frank Goldman, Metropolitan Council of B'nai B'rith Samuel Markle, and American Jewish Committee president Joseph M. Proskauer. Rabbi Stephen S. Wise spoke at the service, and it was conducted by Rabbi Samuel H. Goldenson of Temple Emanu-El, Rabbi David Wice of Newark, New Jersey, Rabbi Israel Goldstein of Temple B'nai Jeshurun, Union of American Hebrew Congregations president Maurice Eisendrath, and B'nai B'rith Hillel Foundation national director Abram L. Sachar. His body was then sent to Omaha, where over 3,000 people attended his funeral at Temple Israel, many of them overflowed to the basement or standing outside. 1,500 people passed the bier when the body was laid in state at the Jewish community center for three hours, and the funeral procession was three hours long. The funeral was conducted by Rabbi Lou Silverman of Temple Israel, and he was assisted by Rabbi Myer S. Kripke of Beth El, Rabbi Israel Mowshowitz of the United Orthodox Congregations, Rabbi Arthur Lelyveld of New York, and Rabbi David Wice of Newark. Abraham L. Sacher delivered the eulogy. He was buried in Fisher Farm Cemetery.
