= Camp Louise =

Jewish summer camp in Maryland, US

- Motto: "A Jewish Camping Tradition"
- Type: Overnight Camp
- Established: 1922
- Affiliations: Camp Airy
- Director: Alicia Berlin
- Students: 450
- Location: 24959 Pen Mar Road; Cascade, Maryland 21719, Cascade, Maryland, United States; 39.71183°N 77.49943°W
- Campus: 400 acres (1.6 km^{2})
- Colors: Green and white
- Website: Camp Airy/Louise website

Camp Louise is an all-girls, Jewish overnight summer camp in the Catoctin Mountains in Cascade, Maryland. It is the sister camp of Camp Airy for boys, which is located in Thurmont. Girls between the ages of 7 and 17 attend for one to seven weeks, depending on their age and interest. Louise is a member of the American Camp Association.

== History ==
Founded in 1922 by Uncle Aaron and Aunt Lillie Straus, the camp aimed to give girls from Baltimore City an opportunity to experience the countryside as well as to give them a break from their factory jobs. The founders placed a one dollar deposit for the land.

== Activities ==
Louise offers campers a variety of activities while at camp. Each day campers attended five scheduled activity periods. Departments offer activities including Arts & Crafts, Athletics, Dance, Drama, Folkdance, Multimedia, Music, Nature, Outdoor Living, Photography, and Swim. In arts and crafts, you can do fun activities like pottery and tie-dye. Campers have the ability to choose some of the activities they attend each day as they sign-up for choice activities and workshops.

Each session, Louise holds a day-long Color Games competition. Camp is split into four teams who compete in field and pool activities for points. Campers also create team banners and skits for the closing ceremony. Each team is led by a captain and a number of co-captains (counselors) and a lieutenant (CIT). Each year, Color Games has a unique theme. Themes in the past have included Outlaw Games, BFF Games, Diva Games, Shrek Games, Music Games, Superhero Games, and Harry Potter Games. The Games were started and designed by Three Unit Leaders in 1988. There are two a year, one each long session every summer.

== Religious aspects ==
Although Louise is a Jewish camp, most of the activities are not religious in nature. The meals are kosher style, meaning that milk and meat are not served at the same time and nothing that is explicitly non-kosher (such as pork) is served. The HaMotzi is sung before each meal as grace. Traditional grace after meals is also recited on Fridays.

Shabbat is observed at camp with short services on Friday night and Saturday morning. Very few structured activities occur during the remainder of Saturday. This “day of rest” creates a certain rhythm that helps punctuate the camp experience.

== Camp Louise Circle ==
The Camp Louise Circle was formed in 1936 by a group of counselors who sought to recognize the dedication of the Camp Louise staff and help them stay connected to Louise beyond their time on staff.

Counselors and staff at Louise who have been on staff full-time for three years or part-time for five years are inducted into a society called Circle. During your third full summer at camp, the summer in which you know that at the end you will join Circle, it is customary to ask someone who is already in Circle to "pin you."'

The Circle Board work year round to fundraise for the organization and for Camp Louise. Each year, Circle hosts Circle Reunion - a weekend where Circle members can return to camp to participate in favorite camp activities like folkdance, campfires, and Shabbat services.

== Notable alumni ==
- Cass Elliot, singer
- Sonia Rutstein, singer in Disappear Fear
- Shari Lewis, entertainer and puppeteer
- Ann Landers, renowned advice columnist
