= B'nai B'rith Girls =

Jewish youth organization for girls

- בבג
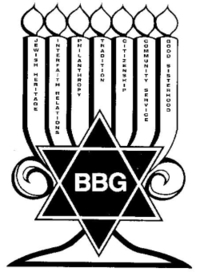
- Founded: April 22, 1944; 82 years ago San Francisco, California
- Type: High school sorority
- Affiliation: BBYO
- Status: Active
- Emphasis: Judaism
- Scope: International
- Motto: More Jewish Teens, More Meaningful Jewish Experiences
- Pillars: Community Service, Philanthropy, Tradition, Citizenship, Inter-Faith Relations, Good Sisterhood, Jewish Heritage, Prayer for World Jewry
- Colors: Red
- Chapters: 2500+
- Headquarters: 1120 20th Street NW, Suite 300 North; Washington, D.C. 20036; United States
- Website: bbyo.org

B'nai B'rith Girls (BBG or בבג) is an international youth-led high school sorority for Jewish teenagers. BBG originated as independent chapters in 1926 and became a wing of BBYO in 1944. It has established more than 2,500 chapters and includes women in grades 8 through 12.

== History ==
In 1924, B'nai B'rith adopted Aleph Zadik Aleph (AZA) as an auxiliary program for young Jewish men. Soon afterwards, efforts began to create an equivalent for Jewish women. The Junior Auxiliary of B'nai B'rith Girls (BBG) formed in Seattle, Washington, in 1926, but quickly disbanded. Another short-lived chapter was established in Newark, New Jersey. In December 1927, Rose Mauser founded the first permanent chapter of BBG in San Francisco, California.

Other chapters were created in the United States and Canada, but BBG lacked a central structure or supervision. These early chapters operated under a variety of names, including B'nai B'rith Girls. Membership was also defined at the local level, ranging from age twelve to thirty. Ten chapters formed the Western Conference at a meeting in Santa Cruz, California, in 1933.

In 1939, Anita Perlman of B'nai B'rith Women's North Shore chapter in Chicago, Illinois, became the chairwoman of B'nai B'rith. Her goal was to build B'nai B'rith Girls into the largest organization of young Jewish women. She added structure to the then disorganized BBG local groups, leading to the recruitment of thousands of participants. Perlman is now credited for the development of BBG.

In 1940, B'nai B'rith Women became a national organization and formed the Women's Supreme Council. It decided to create a national program like AZA for girls under the age of 21, adopting the name B'nai B'rith Girls in 1941. In 1941, the membership of BBG was around 7,000 girls. At its annual meeting in 1943, the Women's Supreme Council voted to coordinate the local chapters of BBG into a national organization. This unification plan was approved by the national executive committee of B'nai B'rith in 1944.

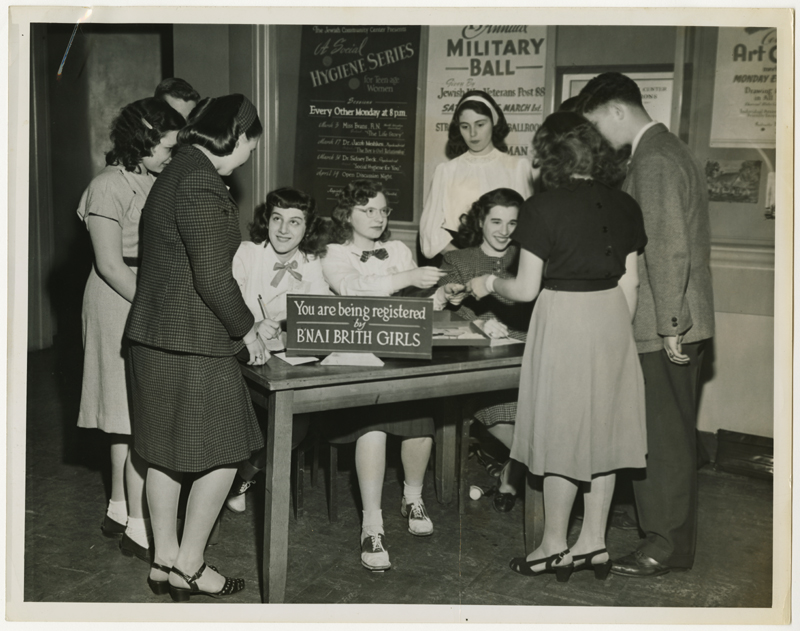
BBG Conference, Bridgeport, Connecticut, circa 1950

By 1944, BBG included 238 local chapters and more than 12,000 members. On April 22, 1944, the Women's Supreme Council and the regional leaders of BBG voted to form B'nai B'rith Girls as national organization at a meeting in Chicago, Illinois. At the same meeting, BBG issued its first ten charters to San Francisco, California (BBG #1); Oakland, California (BBG #2); Linda Strauss, Los Angeles, California (BBG #3); Harrisburg, Pennsylvania (BBG #4); Highland Park, Los Angeles, California (BBG #5); Worcester, Massachusetts (BBG #6); Lancaster, Pennsylvania (BBG #7); Ramah, Chicago, Illinois (BBG #8); Pottsville, Pennsylvania (BBG #9); and Homestead, Pennsylvania (BBG #10). Later in 1944, the B'nai B'rith Youth Organization (BBYO) was established to oversee both BBG and AZA.

By 1952, BBG had grown to include 10,000 members. In 1955, chapters were established in Austria and Belgium. Noar LeNoar, BBG's counterpart in Israel, was established in 1961. Chapters were established in Austria, France, Germany, the Netherlands, Spain, and Switzerland in the 1980s. B'nai B'rith Youth Organization became a legal entity, separate from B'nai B'rith International, in 2002, establishing BBYO as its official name; it continues to oversee BBG and AZA.

== Symbols and traditions ==
The BBG logo is a menorah, a seven-branched candelabrum, which is one of the central symbols of Judaism. The menorah has a Magen David (Star of David) in its center, inside it are the letters BBG. Each candle on the menorah represents one of the original seven Menorah Pledge Principles of BBG. The current Menorah Pledge Principles or pillars are community service, philanthropy, tradition, citizenship, inter-faith relations, good sisterhood, Jewish heritage, and prayer for world Jewry.

BBG's color is red, representing the passion members have for the organization. The password for admittance into a BBG meeting is עמי (Ami) which is Hebrew for "My People" it is now widely known and is only used for ceremonial and traditional purposes only. BBG cheers start with Havdalah, then individual chapter cheers start, which vary from chapter to chapter, ending with regional and finely international cheers; like BBG Heartbeat and Identity.

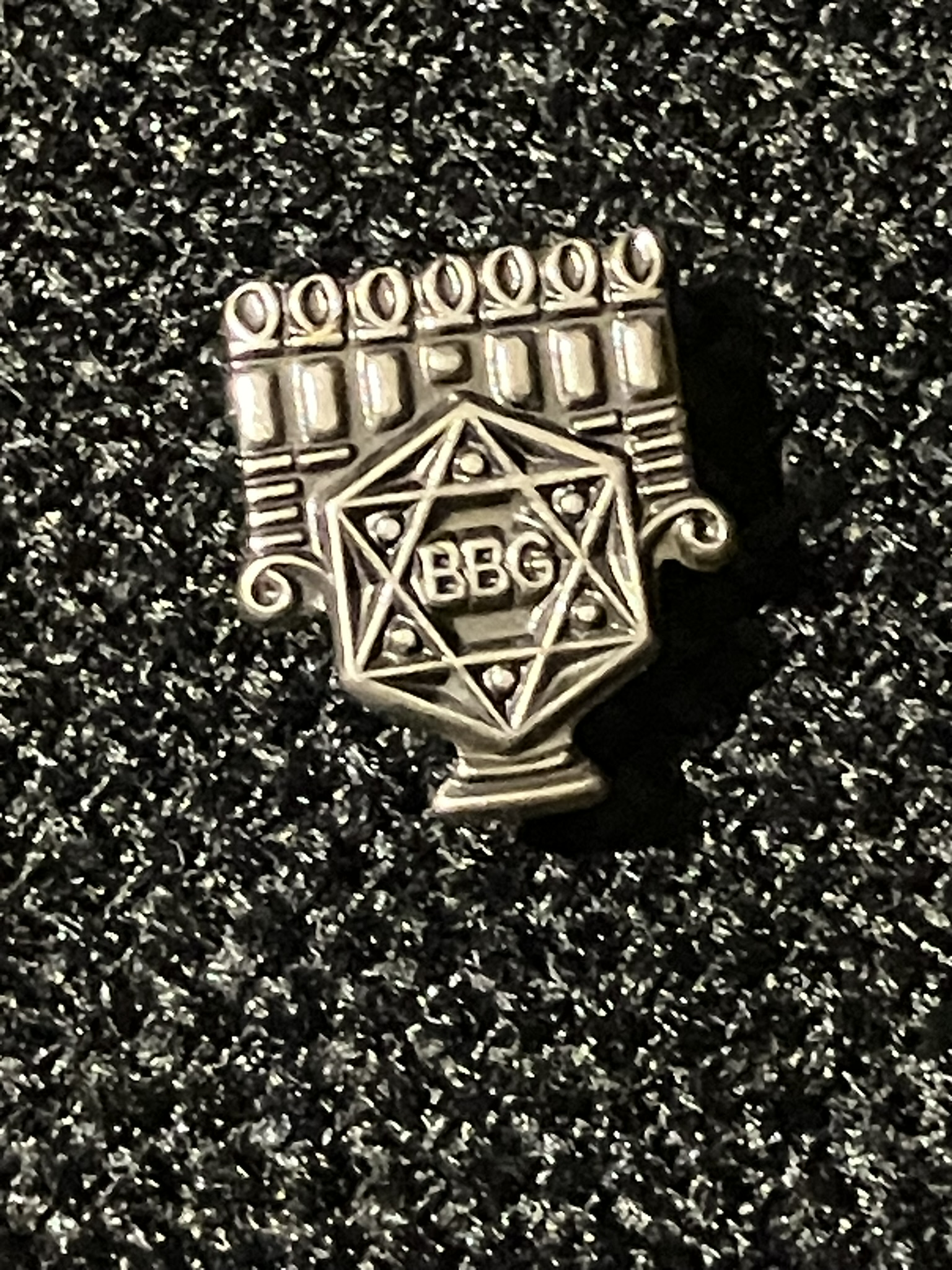
BBG member's pin

=== Pins ===
There are ten BBG pins. The first pin is given when members are inducted into their chapter and the organization; it contains the BBG logo. This pin is supposed to be worn at all BBG functions (including meetings, programs, and conventions) as a way to visually display that someone is a member of the organization. It is worn on one's shirt, over the heart, to symbolize that the principles are being kept close to one's heart.

The N'siah pin is awarded to those who are elected as chapter N'siah (president). The other pins include Gold Star of Deborah, Menorah Pledge and Cardinal Principles, the Silver Star of Deborah, Eternal Light, the Arevut Speak UP Award, Anita Perlman Stand UP, the BBG Founders Society, and the Lifetime Membership Pin.

=== Rituals ===
The opening ceremony is used for chapter, council, regional, and international business meetings. The N'siah bangs the gavel three times, signaling for everyone to rise. She then declares that the meeting has started. The Shomeret Ha-brit reads a prayer appropriate for the meeting. Finally, the N'siah calls for the singing of HaTikvah. The closing ceremony starts with the N'siah rising and bangs the gavel three times, signaling for all the members to rise. Then the Shomeret Ha-Brit reads the closing prayers. The N'siah then declares the meeting over.

== Activities ==
The Six Folds of BBG or considerations are used as the basis for all program planning. The Six Folds of BBG are: Jewish heritage, recreation, community service, social action, creativity, and sisterhood. The primary function of BBG is social. Chapters hold annual celebrations for Jewish holidays. Local chapters also participate in a variety of community service projects and fundraising for nonprofit organizations.

== Governance ==
All BBG meetings are run using the BBYO Parliamentary Procedure, which was modified from Robert's Rules of Order.

=== Levels ===
BBG is administered internationally by BBYO, Inc.'s professional staff in the international office in Washington, D.C. Organizational units outside of North America are affiliated with BBYO, Inc. but are operated independently. In North America, the organization is broken down into different 43 geographic regions, each of which has a professional staff that reports to the international office. Some regions may be further split into councils and cities depending on their size and geography, and each of these may also employ staff. The final level is the chapter, which employs volunteer advisors and reports to their local staff. BBG chapters have their own constitutions that outline their rules and operations. While each one may vary, they are all somewhat based on the international Constitution of B'nai B'rith Girls.

=== Leadership ===
The organization is steered by a democratically elected board of officers on the international, regional, council, and chapter levels. Elections are typically held annually or semi-annually. The executive board positions that are elected at an international level (and the foundation for all other boards at all levels) are N'siah (president), S'ganit (programming vice president), Morah/Aym Ha’Chaverot/Mekasheret (membership vice president), the Yehudia/Shlichah (Judaic vice president), Mazkira (secretary), Gizborit (treasurer), Katvanit (Recording Secretary), and Safranit/Orechet (publicist).

== Chapters ==
As of 2025, BBG has established more than 2,500 chapters in fifty countries.

== Notable members ==
- Anita Brenner, scholar and writer
- Angela Buchdahl, rabbi
- Jean Chatzky, journalist
- Susan Estrich, lawyer, professor, author, political operative, and political commentator
- Samantha Harris, television host, actress, and model
- Pam Jenoff, author, lawyer, and professor of law at Rutgers University
- Adrienne A. Mandel, Maryland House of Delegates
- Sara Miller McCune, co-founder and chair emeritus of Sage Publishing

== See also ==
- Aleph Zadik Aleph
- BBYO
- B'nai B'rith Perlman Camp
- High school fraternities and sororities
- UK and Ireland BBYO
- Aleph Zadik Aleph
