= Aleph Zadik Aleph =

International fraternity for Jewish teenagers

- אצא
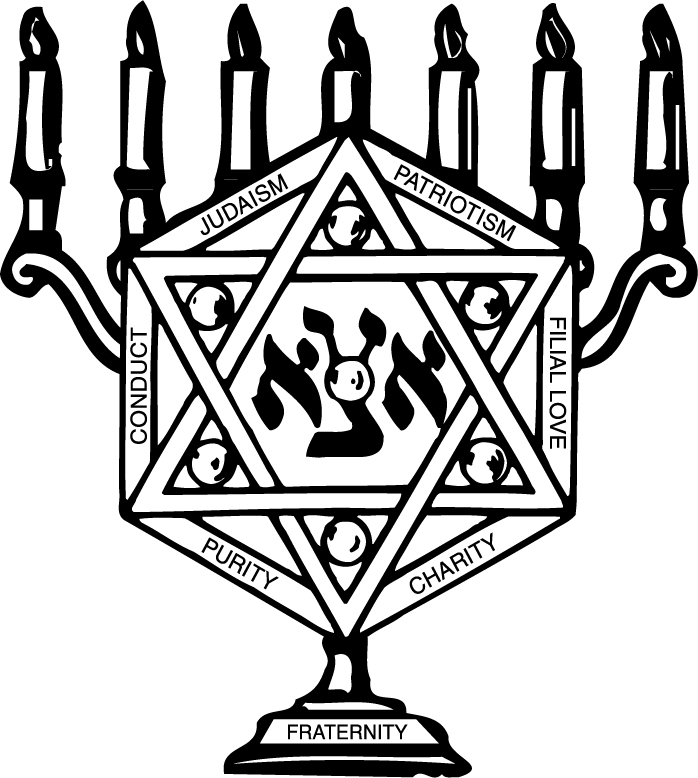
- Founded: May 3, 1924; 102 years ago Omaha, Nebraska
- Type: High school
- Affiliation: BBYO
- Status: Active
- Emphasis: Jewish
- Scope: International
- Motto: "More Jewish Teens, More Meaningful Jewish Experiences"
- Pillars: Patriotism, Judaism, filial love, charity, conduct, purity, and fraternity
- Colors: Blue
- Chapters: 2,500+ chartered
- Colonies: 11
- Members: 15,000 (2005) active
- Headquarters: 529 14th Street NW, Suite 705; Washington, District of Columbia 20045; United States
- Website: bbyo.org

The Grand Order of the Aleph Zadik Aleph (AZA or אצא) is an international youth-led fraternal organization for Jewish teenagers. It was founded in 1924 as the male wing of BBYO Inc., an independent non-profit organization. It is for teens starting in 8th grade, through 12th grade.

== History ==
=== Founding ===
AZA was founded on May 3, 1924, in Omaha, Nebraska, by a group of 14 Jewish teenagers between the ages of 15 and 17. It arose as a response to the fact that the Jewish community was, for the most part, not allowed into the Greek fraternities. The letters were chosen to spite the fraternity the Alephs were denied, Alpha Zeta Alpha, by naming their fraternity the Hebrew counterparts. However, others maintain that AZA was not founded as a form of protest against Greek fraternities. Rather, conversations with the founding members years later revealed that the organization's name was chosen specifically in an attempt to mimic Greek fraternities.

The first chapter, formed in 1923, was Mother Chapter AZA #1, which continues to operate. The second oldest chapter also continues to operate out of Kansas City Council and is AZA #2.

Abe Babior, the new group's first president, said that it was started "as a social and Zionist youth group." The group's meetings would usually feature speakers on several both Judaic and non-Judaic topics. The group held social events, including parties and dances. The group's first advisor was Nathan Mnookin. An accomplished chemist, he moved back to his hometown of Kansas City in November 1923 and immediately started a similar organization of the same name. Mnookin's departure paved the way for the next AZA advisor in Omaha, Sam Beber.

=== National organization ===
As Beber continued to serve as an advisor for the local Omaha group, he also began planning for a much larger undertaking: an international Jewish youth group. Beber called a meeting of friends and associates in the area on May 3, 1924, where they reached an understanding of goals and formed the first Supreme Advisory Committee (SAC) consisting of seven men, and officially founding the Aleph Zadik Aleph for Young Men. The new organization's first chapter charter was granted to the existing AZA group in Omaha, dubbed "Mother Chapter" with Mnookin's second chapter in Kansas City receiving a charter a week later. By the end of the month, new chapters had been launched in Lincoln, Nebraska, and Des Moines, Iowa.

The first AZA convention was held that summer at the Jewish Community Center in Omaha, July 4–6, 1924. Over two-thirds of the new organization's membership was present to elect their first-ever Grand Aleph Godol (international president). In a tight race that required a referral to the SAC to break a tie vote, Charles Shane emerged victorious. In other business conducted, the boys chose to commit a third of their membership dues (at that time $3) to charity. AZA became an official junior group in 1925.

By the second annual convention, held in Kansas City, AZA in July 1925, membership had ballooned to 250, and new chapters were inaugurated in eight more cities. Philip Klutznick, among AZA's most accomplished alumni, was elected as the 2nd Grand Aleph Godol. During his term, he installed ten chapters in the eastern part of the country and oversaw the creation of The Shofar, the organization's international newsletter. Following his term in office, the organization rewarded him by making him, at the age of 19, their first executive director. By the third annual convention in July 1925, the group had 800 members and twenty chapters.

In 1940, AZA had 21,152 members, 417 chapters, and 9,875. Chapters were located in Bulgaria, Palestine, Syria, and the United States. In 1974, AZA was at its height with 40,000 members. Membership had declined to 15,000 in 2005.

== Symbols and traditions ==
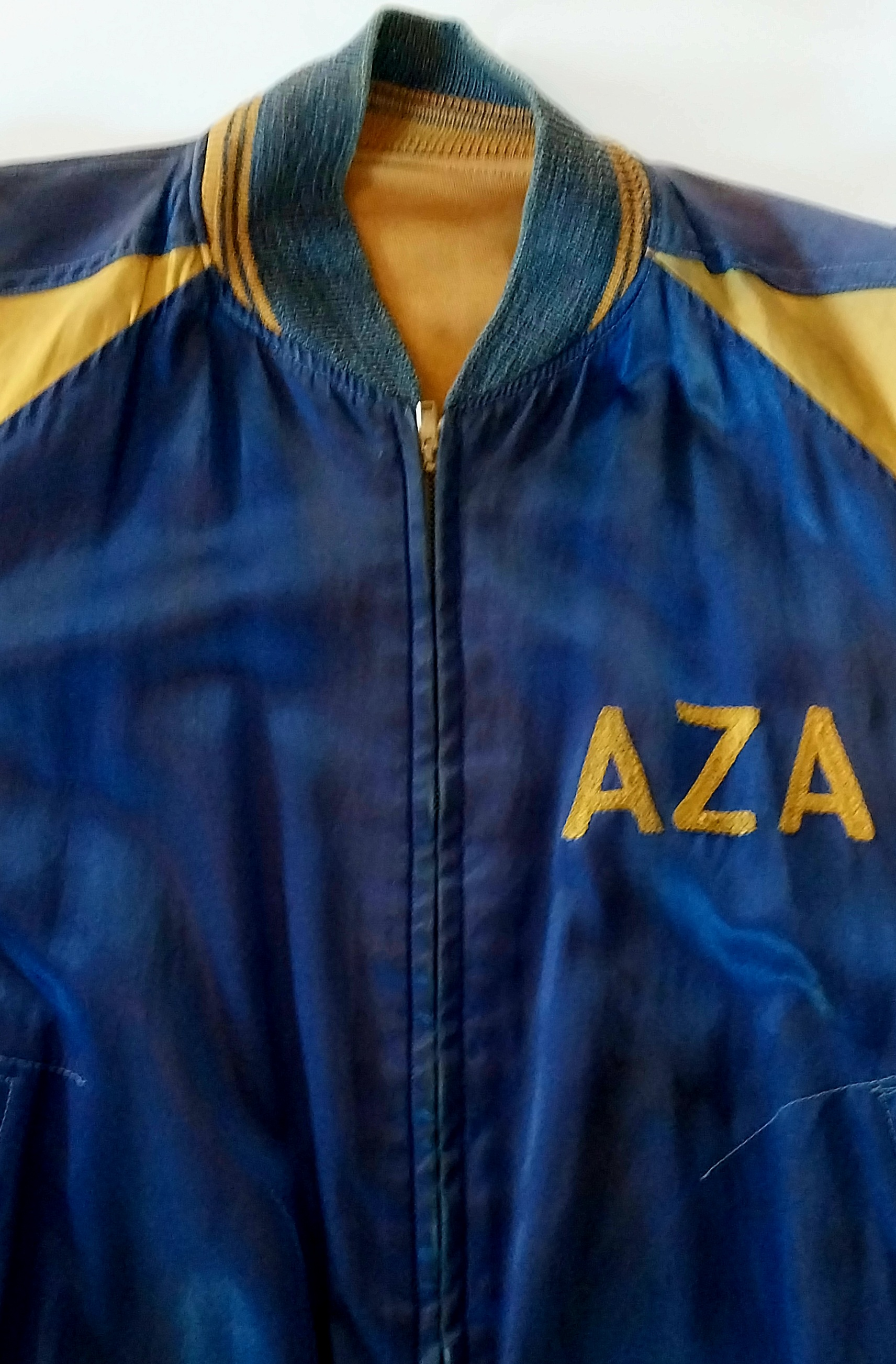
1940s AZA jacket from Lowell, Massachusetts

The letters Aleph Zadik Aleph and stands for Ahava (fraternal love), Tzedakah (benevolence), and Ahdoot (harmony). The letters were also the same as those of Alpha Zeta Alpha, a local fraternity in Omaha that banned Jewish members at the time. Its motto is "More Jewish Teens, More Meaningful Jewish Experiences" The fraternity's color is blue, symbolizing loyalty, trust, and wisdom.

The AZA logo is a menorah, a seven-branched candelabrum, which is one of the central symbols of Judaism. The menorah has a hexagonal shape in its center, with each side of the hexagon and the base of the menorah containing one of the 7 Cardinal Principles. In the center of the hexagon is a Magen david (Star of David), and inside it are the Hebrew letters Aleph Zadik Aleph.

The password "Ami" (My People) to enter an AZA meeting is now widely known and is used for ceremonial and traditional purposes only.

When members ("Alephs") are inducted into the organization, they receive a pin containing the AZA logo. This pin is to be worn at all AZA functions (including meetings, programs, and conventions) as a way of visually displaying one's membership in the organization. It is supposed to be worn on one's shirt, over the heart, to symbolize that the principles (which are inscribed on the AZA logo on the pin) are being kept close to one's heart. Aleph Pins are never to be worn straight, to represent that "no Aleph is perfect."

Many of the AZA spirit songs date back to the earliest days of the organization. The most commonly sung song is "Up You Men", the official pep song of the organization which dates to 1931, when it was the winning entry in a song contest. It was composed by Heinie Krinsky and Wes Bercovich from Oakland, and in modern times is sung both at a fast pace as a rally song, and sometimes in a slow and somber tone as a brotherhood song. "Come Join Us In Our Song" is a popular song to be sung at conventions and summer programs. It is the longest of the AZA songs. It was originally called "Meyer Levin's Marching Song" and was written for AZA Invite by the members of Meyer Levin AZA in Chicago in 1964. The verses are sung to the tune of "The Ballad of the Greenland Whalers", and the chorus is sung to the tune of "The Coast Guard Hymn". "Sweetheart of AZA", also composed by Krinsky and Bercovich, is traditionally recited when the sweetheart (a well-liked BBG member chosen to serve in the role at various levels) enters the room, although its use in modern times varies from region to region. Lastly, Simon Wiesenthal AZA #2524 in Central Region West is noted for writing the widely sung cheer "AZA All the Way." Other official songs include "Stand Together," "Tomorrow and Today," "This Is Our Order", "No Man Is An Island", and "The General".

There are Seven Cardinal Principles through which all AZA members (Alephs) are expected to conduct their lives. These principles underline the intent and character of the organization. They are patriotism, Judaism, filial love, charity, conduct, purity, and fraternity. These principles are inscribed on the AZA logo. They are often recited during opening rituals of business meetings.

== Activities ==
Six programming "folds", or considerations, are used as the basis for all program planning. In 1928, Dr. Boris D. Bogen, one of the founders of the American Jewish Joint Distribution Committee, presented his ideas for the original "Five-Fold-and-Full Plan" to AZA's governing body, the Supreme Advisory Council. He proposed the addition of the original five programming folds: Social, Athletics, Community Service / Social Action, Education, and Judaism (S.A.C.E.J.) In 2020, the 97th Executive Body voted to add a sixth programming fold, 'health'. It is expected that all AZA events fall into at least one of these folds, and it is encouraged that programs span multiple folds. A program that incorporates every fold, a "six-fold program", is considered a significant undertaking and is particularly special.

== Governance ==
=== Levels ===
AZA is administered internationally by BBYO, Inc.'s professional staff in the international office in Washington, D.C. Organizational units outside of North America are affiliated with BBYO, Inc. but are operated independently. In North America, the organization is broken down into 43 geographic regions, each of which has a professional staff that reports to the international office. Some regions may be further split into councils and cities depending on their size and geography, and each of these may also employ staff. The final level is the chapter, which employs volunteer advisors, and reports to their local staff. All members belong to a single chapter. Some BBYO programs (such as summer programs in Israel) do not require membership in BBYO.

=== Leadership ===
The organization is steered by a democratically elected board of officers on the international, regional, council, and chapter levels. The officers elected may vary from one level to the other and between different chapters and regions. A group of elected officers is often referred to as the "executive board", or just simply the "board". Elections are typically held annually or semi-annually. Boards are often referred to by the first letter of their jurisdiction for levels higher than chapter board. For example, Regional Board can be called 'R Board' and International Board can be called 'I Board'.

The executive board positions that are elected at an international level (and the foundation for all other boards at all levels) are Aleph Godol (president), Aleph S'gan (programming vice president), Aleph Moreh (membership vice president), Aleph Shaliach (Judaic vice president), Aleph Mazkir (secretary), and Aleph Gizbor (treasurer).

In some places, additional officers may be elected based on need. Each region, council, and chapter may have its constitution detailing the positions to be elected and their specific responsibilities, so long as it does not conflict with the international constitution. Additionally, each chapter may have a different variation of the positions. For example, Ruach AZA #2388 has the Mazkir and Gizbor merged into one position: The MazGiz.

== Affiliation ==
AZA's sister organization, for teenage girls, is the B'nai B'rith Girls. The connection between AZA and B'nai B'rith dates back to AZA's earliest days when Sam Beber was simultaneously serving as the AZA advisor and as the vice president of the B'nai B'rith lodge in Omaha. Soon thereafter, the new organization was able to secure funding from the regional B'nai B'rith lodge. At the first AZA international convention in 1924, it was resolved that the organization should seek affiliation with B'nai B'rith. Beber commenced communication, and at the executive committee meeting in January 1925, President Adolf Kraus appointed a committee to explore the matter, headed by Henry Monsky. A fellow Omaha resident, Monsky brought the issue of adopting "junior auxiliaries" to the forefront of the organization. Following B'nai B'rith's international convention, in which Monsky's committee recommended the adoption of AZA as the official youth organization of B'nai B'rith, the executive committee met and immediately adopted the recommendation.

B'nai B'rith lodges often adopted AZA chapters, collaborated on joint programming, and served in an advisory capacity. AZA was eventually combined with the B'nai B'rith Girls (BBG) into what would become known as the B'nai B'rith Youth Organization (BBYO). As the male wing of BBYO, AZA continued to maintain its unique character, traditions, and rituals, even though it was administered jointly with BBG under the BBYO umbrella. BBYO split from B'nai B'rith in 2002 and was re-formed as an independent non-profit organization.

== Chapters ==
Chapters are located across the United States and more than forty other countries.

== Notable members ==
- Leibel Bergman, American communist activist
- Brad Cohen, motivational speaker, teacher, school administrator, and author who has severe Tourette syndrome
- Mark Cuban, American businessman and film producer
- Morton Denn, rheologist, chemical engineer, and professor emeritus at the City College of New York
- Russ Feingold, former United States Senator from Wisconsin
- Michael Froman, president of the Council on Foreign Relations
- Philip Klutznick, U.S. Secretary of Commerce
- Ira A. Lipman, founder and chairman of Guardsmark
- Adam Sandler, American actor and comedian
- Matt Meyer, Governor of Delaware

== See also ==
- List of Jewish fraternities and sororities
- BBYO
