= BBYO =

Jewish teen organisation

B'nai B'rith Youth Organization
- Founded: May 3, 1924; 102 years ago Omaha, Nebraska, US
- Type: Jewish
- Affiliation: Independent; B'nai B'rith International
- Status: Active
- Emphasis: Jewish youth
- Scope: International
- Pillars: Inclusivity, Jewish Identity, Active Leadership, and Tradition
- Colors: Red and Blue
- Chapters: 700+
- Members: 70,000 high school active 350,000 lifetime
- Nickname: Alephs, BBGs
- Headquarters: 529 14th Street NW, Suite 705; Washington, District of Columbia 20045; United States
- Website: www.bbyo.org

The B'nai B'rith Youth Organization (BBYO) is a Jewish teen movement, organized as a 501(c)(3) nonprofit organization and headquartered in Washington, D.C. The organization is intended to build the identity of Jewish teens and offer leadership development programs.

On June 19, 2001, the movement split from B'nai B'rith International, which had been its parent organization, to become incorporated as B'nai B'rith Youth Organization Inc.

BBYO is organized into local fraternity- and sorority-like chapters. Male chapters are known as Aleph Zadik Aleph and their members are known as Alephs and female chapters as B'nai B'rith Girls, and their members are known as BBGs. AZA and BBG were independent organizations (beginning in 1924 and 1944 respectively) before becoming brother and sister organizations under B'nai B'rith. In some communities, there are co-ed BBYO chapters that borrow traditions from both organizations.

== History ==
=== Early days of BBYO ===
AZA's original advisor, Nathan Mnookin, soon left Omaha for his hometown of Kansas City, where he started a similar group with the same name. The Omaha group selected a new advisor, Sam Beber, who soon laid out his plans for an international youth movement based on the local AZA model. On May 3, 1924, the Aleph Tzadik Aleph for Young Men, now an international Jewish fraternity, was formed according to Kubo's plan, with the Omaha and Kansas City chapters receiving the first two charters. Four chapters were in attendance at the first convention in June 1924, and ten at the second convention the following summer.

By 1925, AZA had expanded east with dozens of chapters across the country. At Beber's urging, B'nai B'rith took up the issue of officially adopting AZA as its junior auxiliary at their national convention in 1925. Supported by Henry Monsky, who himself was vying for the B'nai B'rith presidency, the convention adopted a committee report affirming its approval of the organization under B'nai B'rith's jurisdiction. Immediately following the convention, the B'nai B'rith Executive Committee met and officially adopted AZA, which then became known as the Aleph Zadik Aleph of B'nai B'rith.

=== BBYO's beginnings ===
In 1944, after a few past failed attempts to begin a Jewish youth group for young women, B'nai B'rith Girls (BBG) became officially recognized and adopted by B'nai B'rith. Anita Perlman is credited with the development of BBG as Sam Beber is credited with the AZA. For the first time, AZA and BBG were united under a single organization, officially cementing their relationship and brother and sister organizations. Combined, the two youth movements were called the B'nai B'rith Youth Organization, and BBYO was born.

=== From past to present with BBYO ===
After more than 75 years of general prosperity, B'nai B'rith began a massive restructuring at the turn of the 21st century in response to the changing face of North American Jewry. As a result, what was then the B'nai B'rith Youth Organization split from B'nai B'rith and, on June 19, 2001, it was incorporated as B'nai B'rith Youth Organization Inc., a separate nonprofit organization. The new organization received substantial funding from the Charles and Lynn Schusterman Family Philanthropies, and it was chaired by Lynn Schusterman.

On February 15–19, 2024 BBYO held its Intentional Convention in Orlando, Florida. This convention marked its 100th year as a youth organization for the AZA (Boys) and 80th year for BBG's (girls). The organization is active in more than seventy regions in Europe, South Africa, Australia, and North America. As of 2024, BBYO has more than 700 chapters in fifty counties, with 70,000 members and over 350,000 alumni.

== Symbols ==
BBYO's core values or pillars are Inclusivity, Jewish Identity, Active Leadership, and Tradition. The color red is associated with its sorority B’nai B’rith Girls, while blue is associated with its boy's fraternity Aleph Zadik Aleph. Red symbolizes the member's passion for the organization. Blue represents loyalty, trust, and wisdom.

== Organizational model ==
BBYO is organized into local fraternity- and sorority-like chapters. Male chapters are known as AZA chapters and their members are called Alephs. Female chapters are known as BBG chapters, their members are called BBGs. AZA and BBG were independent organizations (beginning in 1924 and 1944 respectively) before becoming brother and sister organizations under B'nai B'rith. In some communities, there are co-ed BBYO chapters that borrow traditions from both organizations.

== See also ==
- List of Jewish fraternities and sororities
