= Team2015 =

Political campaign

Team2015 was a political campaign initiative by the Conservative Party UK that aimed to recruit volunteers for the 2015 general election. It was set up by Grant Shapps, Conservative Party Chairman, as a vehicle for organizing volunteers to campaign in the target 40/40 seats. The core leads of the team are Stella Kyriazis, Charles Spungin and the Party Chairman's Office. As of December 2014 there were approximately 40,000 volunteers who had joined the initiative.

== Background ==
Prior to Team2015, volunteers were provided through the membership of the party. However, the Team2015 project was open to anyone who wishes to participate in campaigning, and being a Conservative Party member was not required. Team2015 was envisaged as a way of de-fragmenting the volunteer base of the Conservative Party, particularly those based in marginal seats, and to utilize the skills of these volunteers to the best of their ability. Also, the team encouraged many different ways to volunteer, including both frontline and background activities. Team2015 was set up in the spring of 2013 and ran up to the general election in 2015, in which the Conservatives gained an overall majority.

== Function ==
The team operated on the following ideas:

- Volunteer members of Team2015 did not have to be members of the Conservative Party
- Personal contact
- Analyzing peoples' skills and utilizing these to best campaigning practice
- Offering different levels of rewards according to the degree of effort provided by the volunteer

== Reward scheme ==
The team used a recognition scheme based on that successfully implemented for the London Olympics 2012 games, rewarding volunteers for the time and effort they put into the campaign. These rewards included a Team2015 badge, Team2015 certificate and a reception with the Party Chairman or a Government Minister. Top rewards included meeting the Prime Minister at a reception.

== Social media ==
Team2015 utilised social networking platforms such as Facebook (Team2015Conservatives, and Twitter (@team2015). It enabled participants to access up-to-date information on news and events, as well as providing insights into the day-to-day lives of Team2015 volunteers with pictures and videos.

== Successes and failures ==
The rationale for the usefulness of the team was initially derided, even within the Conservative Party. Although some campaigning activities were implemented during the May 2014 Local elections, press reports of the activities of Team2015 stated volunteers were pivotal in winning the Newark by-election.
