= Make Me Prime Minister =

British reality television show

- Promotional image for series
- Genre: Reality television; Political satire
- Directed by: Josh Jacobs
- Presented by: Alastair Campbell; Sayeeda Warsi
- Country of origin: United Kingdom
- Original language: English
- No. of seasons: 1
- No. of episodes: 6

Production
- Executive producer: Matt Edmondson
- Producer: Charlie McLean
- Production companies: Channel 4; Twofour; AOP; Motion Content Group

Original release
- Network: Channel 4; All 4
- Release: 27 September – 25 October 2022

Make Me Prime Minister is a 2022 British reality game show. The programme features political tasks said to be based on the role of Prime Minister in the United Kingdom. The series features contestants competing to be made Channel 4's "alternative prime minister". The critical response to the programme has been mixed but broadly negative.

== Production and format ==
The programme is co-produced by Twofour, Accidentally on Purpose (AOP) and Motion Content Group, and is funded by Channel 4. There are six episodes, the first of which aired on 27 September.

The programme required contestants to complete tasks modelled on government and politics in a structure similar to The Apprentice. They were guided by Alastair Campbell and Sayeeda Warsi. Former prime ministers Tony Blair of the Labour Party and David Cameron of the Conservative Party were also featured.

== Series overview ==
=== Contestants ===
The series featured twelve candidates of various political leanings. They were described in a press release by Channel 4 as "ordinary yet opinionated". The group included Jackie Weaver, a local government employee who gained attention during the COVID-19 pandemic when a video of her managing a confrontational council meeting over Zoom was widely viewed online.

Candidate	Background	Age	Result
Natalie Balmain	Medical Communications Director	36	Winner
Kelly Given	Equality & Diversity Inclusion Manager	25	Finalist, second place
Holly Morgan	Ex-footballer & Sports Agent	29	Finalist, third place
Danny Price	Venue operator	37	Eliminated in semi-final
Adam Kirby	Marketing Consultant	61	Eliminated in semi-final
Rico Jacob-Chace	Diversity Consultant	30	Eliminated in semi-final
Conall Doyle	Paralegal	24	Eliminated in fourth episode
Jackie Weaver	Chief Officer (local government)	66	Resigned in fourth episode
Verity Pitts	Restaurant Manager & Model	22	Eliminated in third episode
Alice Grant	Student	18	Withdrew after second episode
Caroline Thomson-Smith	Hairdresser	55	Eliminated in second episode
Darius Nasimi	Entrepreneur & Charity Fundraiser	23	Eliminated in first episode

=== Performance chart ===
Candidate	Episode Number					
Candidate	1	2	3	4	5	6
Natalie	WIN	IN	IN	IN	IN	1st
Kelly	IN	WIN	IN	IN	WIN	2nd
Holly	IN	LOSE	IN	IN	IN	3rd
Danny	IN	IN	LOSE	IN	OUT	
Adam	IN	IN	IN	WIN	OUT	
Rico	IN	IN	WIN	IN	OUT	
Conall	IN	IN	IN	OUT		
Jackie	IN	IN	IN	OUT		
Verity	IN	IN	OUT			
Alice	IN	IN	LEFT			
Caroline	IN	OUT				
Darius	OUT					

Key:

The contestant was chosen as alternative Prime Minister.
The contestant was a runner-up.
The contestant won as Prime Minister of his/her party, for this task.
The contestant lost as Prime Minister of his/her party, for this task.
The contestant was on the winning party for this task.
The contestant was on the losing party for this task.
The contestant was sent home in this task.
The contestant lost as Prime Minister for this task and was sent home or resigned.
The contestant quit during this task

== Episodes ==
List of Make Me Prime Minister episodes
No.	Theme	Original release date	UK viewers (millions)
1	Education	27 September 2022	0.8
The contestants are organised into two "parties" and asked to come up with a policy to reform primary education. One party chooses Darius as its "prime minister" and the other chooses Natalie. Natalie's party come up with the idea of one vocational lesson a day in an area of the child's choosing and Darius' party decide on the idea of one creative lesson a day to be held outside the classroom. They test their ideas on some children and come up with a plan to fund them. Darius's party decide to fund their idea by reducing funding to school inspections whilst Natalie's party increase corporation tax by 1%. The parties discuss their policies with the judges who are sceptical of them. The parties hold press events for their policies. Darius' party visit a primary school and organise outdoor activities for the children. Darius dances around a maypole. This annoys Campbell who feels Darius is giving the press opportunities to take undignified photos. Darius and his "press officer" Holly take questions from journalists Pippa Crerar and Andrew Pierce. At the end of the event, Darius is criticised by party members who don't realise the journalists are still present. Natalie teaches a computing lesson to schoolchildren where she dresses as a robot. She and her press officer Conall take questions from Katy Balls and Tim Shipman. Both parties receive negative headlines based on the media events with Darius being criticised for how he plans to fund his policy and Natalie for suggesting that time could be found for vocational lessons by reducing study of foreign languages. Natalie and Darius debate in front of and take questions from a studio audience who vote on which policy they prefer. The results are 72% in favour of Natalie's party. Darius is asked whether he would like to resign and leave the programme or stay and allow the judges to decide who is eliminated. He chooses not to resign and says other members of the party bear responsibility for the defeat. Whilst critical of the performance of some other party members, the judges choose to send Darius home.
2	Health	4 October 2022	N/A
In new parties, the contestants are asked to come up with a plan to reduce obesity levels. Campbell tells them that both parties' performance on the last challenge was inadequate and that they need to "think bigger" this week. Kelly is chosen as Prime Minister of her party and Holly of hers. Holly is considering providing incentives to engage in fitness activities whilst Kelly is more interested in the social factors which affect health. Both parties send teams to research ideas whilst the remaining contestants work on brand names for their respective initiatives. Kelly's party come up with the name LiveBetter after her and Adam come into conflict over the type of mocking humour he wanted to use in the slogan. Holly's party come up with the slogan i♡health which the research team thinks is absurd when they are told over the phone. A focus group suggests to Kelly's party the idea of universal free school meals which they adopt. After a negative response from their focus group, Holly's party decide on daily physical education at schools and subsidised Gym memberships. For their media event to launch the policy, two members of Kelly's party dress up as a strawberry and fast food to fight a duel. They take questions from Tim Shipman and Grace Blakeley. They were observed by MP Jess Phillips in place of Campbell for the event. At her party's media event, Holly visits athletes. They take questions from Zoe Williams and Olivia Utley whilst Caroline is press officer and accused of talking to the press excessively. Both parties get negative headlines based on the events. The two Prime Ministers debate in front of a voting audiences. Warsi observes that Holly had a better policy but Kelly a better presentation. The judges announce that Kelly's party got 64% of the vote. Holly chooses not to resign. The judges are critical of the performance of multiple party members but choose to eliminate Caroline.
3	National Crisis	11 October 2022	N/A
Alice announces that she is going to leave the contest for personal reasons. The reorganised parties are led to situation rooms where they will be dealing with a series of crises. They are observed from another room by the judges who are joined by MPs Johnny Mercer and Chris Bryant. Danny and Rico are chosen as the prime ministers. Each prime minister appoints a Home Secretary, Press Secretary, Head of Media Strategy and Foreign Secretary to deal with different aspects of crisis management. Their first challenge is to manage protests about the cost of living. Rico's team argue with Rico uncertain, Jackie in favour of deploying the riot police but Kelly and Conall more sceptical. Danny quickly decides that he does not want the protesters "treated like criminals" and instead wants a limited number of police sent in with assistance provided to the public. Rico eventually decides not to send them in. The parties are then informed that a British submarine secretly patrolling in French territorial waters has been lost track of. Danny's party decide to attempt to rescue the submarine without the knowledge of the French authorities. Bryant is sceptical of this and Warsi believes Danny was allowing his own instincts to be overruled by Adam. After some debate in their party, Kelly persuades Rico that the best option is to inform the French Government and ask for their help in retrieving the submarine. Natalie, Rico's foreign secretary, disagrees with this decision but contritely tells the French Ambassador who is annoyed but agrees to help. Both the other party members and the judges are impressed by her performance. Danny's party get a call from the French Ambassador who has learnt of the operation. Verity, the foreign secretary, provides an inaccurate explanation of what's happened, and the French Ambassador says, "there will probably be some consequences." With the protests escalating, the parties are informed a cyber-attack is taking place. Danny decides to focus on preventing blackouts rather than finding the root cause of the attacks. A decision the judges disapprove of. Rico's party make the opposite decision which the judges approve of. The teams continue to deal with the effects of the cyberattacks whilst press secretaries Holly and Conall take calls from the media. The judges approve of Conall's performance but feel that Holly is talking to them for too long. Rico's team who focused on finding the source of the attack are told that it is almost certainly an unmanned compound in Oman. Whilst Danny's are provided with less certainty. Rico's team decide after argument to send soldiers in to shut down the server which is a success. Danny's team decide to fire a missile to destroy the compound which also succeeds. The judges decide Rico's party won the challenge. The judges question Danny's party about their performance. Whilst critical of multiple party members they decide to send home Verity.
4	Energy/local campaigning	18 October 2022	N/A
The contests travel to Shropshire. They are told they will be coming up with a policy to deal with rising energy prices. The parties choose Jackie and Adam as their respective prime ministers. Jackie is chosen over Conall as her party's leader beginning a theme of tensions between the two contestants which continues throughout the episode. In Adam's party, Kelly suggests white rosettes in order to be apolitical which the party agree with whilst Jackie sees white as associated with surrender so her party decides on purple. Adam's party decide on the policy of a nationalised wind power company though Rico dislikes the idea. Jackie's party come up with the idea of turning food waste into fuel. Each party splits into two groups with one going to canvass the public on doorsteps. The Prime Ministers are interviewed by a local radio station. The judges praise Kelly and Danny for their manner when interacting with the public. Holly and Conall from Jackie's party are described as friendly but not getting the information they need. The colour purple is associated with UKIP by the radio journalist and members of the public. The party members who aren't canvassing design billboards. In Adam's party, the research team dislike the billboard seeing the slogan as overly vague and are confused as to why a picture of Rico is included. Jackie's party like theirs. The parties receive questions from Katy Balls and local journalist Mark Andrews. Both come into conflict during the press event and receive negative headlines based on that. The two Prime Ministers debate in front of a voting audience of local residents. Adam's party wins by 72% to 28%. Jackie chooses to resign, and the judges eliminate Conall.
5	Crime\Interviews	25 October 2022	N/A
The parties are told to come up with a policy to reduce crime. Kelly, Danny and Holly all put themselves forward as a potential Prime minister of their party but decide on Kelly. The other party choose Rico. Danny, a former offender, suggests expanded rehabilitation which Kelly agrees with. After much discussion, Rico's party decide on more communication between communities and the police. The two parties visit organisations practising similar ideas. They are advised by the Judges for their media interviews. The non-Prime Minister party members are interviewed by Krishnan Guru-Murthy by Channel 4 News. In Rico's party, the Judges see Natalie as doing badly, waffling and being overwhelmed. Adam is seen as doing better. In Kelly's party, Holly is seen as making a good start whilst Danny's description of his personal experiences is praised. The Prime ministers are interviewed by Nick Ferrari on LBC. Kelly is praised and described as like a politician. Rico is also seen as doing well. The Judges decide that Kelly's party has won the challenge. As such, Kelly is automatically through to the final. The five remaining contestants are interviewed by the judges. Rico, Adam and Danny are sent home.
6	Final	25 October 2022	N/A
The judges congratulate the finalists on getting this far and say that they will participating in a series of activities modeled on an election campaign and selling an idea of their choosing to the public. Each finalist chooses an eliminated contestant to help them. Natalia wants to tackle tax avoidance, Holly wants to tackle institutionalised racism and Kelly wants to provide a home to everyone who needs one. They choose red, black and pink as their respective colours. The contestants record launch films though Kelly who has Autism finds the setting overwhelming. The next day the contestants and their supporters travel on campaign buses to a rally. Journalists Tim Shipman, Zoe Williams and Olivia Utley question the contestants. All of them have some concerns but all the contestants receive positive headlines based on the rallies. The candidates' debate in front of a studio audience who were selected to be representative of the results of the 2019 United Kingdom general election. The contestants are introduced with their campaign videos and then each make a statement. The parties are questioned about their policies and policy more generally by Krishan Guru-Murthy. They then receive questions from the audience. The audience votes for their preferred alternative prime minister. The results are 52% for Natalie, 27% for Kelly and 21% for Holly. Natalie makes a final statement.

== Reception ==
Much of the critical response to the programme was negative with multiple reviews drawing negative comparisons to business-themed reality TV series The Apprentice. A review in Metro described the series as "a total rip-off". A review in the i argued that the series had "neither the gravitas of actual politics nor the ding-dong irascibility of reality telly ... While recent political scenes might lead us to believe otherwise, politics is a serious business. And serious TV and reality entertainment are a match fated to go down in the dreariest of flames." A reviewer in The Telegraph commented that the show "shines a light on the basic practices and structures of a political operation, but never quite rises above cosplay. I'm not yet convinced it’s got my vote." An article in UnHerd argued that the TV series reflected a wrong-headed attitude which belittled political expertise and argued that effective leadership could purely be provided by common sense. An article in the New Statesman was critical of the programme suggesting that it was reflective of an attitude which saw politics as a silly, humorous game and belittled its real-life consequences. The magazine's formal review concluded that "For weary audiences, watching individuals questionably fit for public office argue and flounder is less entertainment and more, well, The News."

A more positive review in The Independent described the programme's purpose as "to entertain and to educate us a little" and commented that "I have to say, having been badly jaundiced by over-exposure to politics and politicians over some decades, I am pleasantly surprised at how well the show works. Somehow it actually manages to make the political process look like God’s work. A minor miracle." Lucy Mangan in The Guardian attested to a personal dislike for the contestants and judges, but considered that the programme worked on its own merits, concluding: "Technically it's worth five stars. In every other way, I wish I was dead." A neutral review in The Times said of the programme: "Really it is neither good nor bad, but merely the exact result of saying, 'Let’s remake The Apprentice, almost frame by frame, but this time about politics.'"
