= Conservative Friends of Palestine =

Parliamentary group

- Abbreviation: CfoP
- Formation: May 2023; 3 years ago
- Founder: Sayeeda Warsi, Flick Drummond
- Location: United Kingdom
- Chair: Sayeeda Warsi, Baroness Warsi
- Affiliations: Conservative Party
- Website: www.cfopalestine.uk

The Conservative Friends of Palestine (CFoP) is a parliamentary group within the British Conservative Party that promotes and advocates for "peace and justice" in Palestine and is currently chaired by ex-cabinet minister Sayeeda Warsi, Baroness Warsi who co-founded it with Flick Drummond.

Within the first two months of founding, there were 35 Conservative MP and members of the House of Lords in the group, making up just 6% of the total, in contrast to Conservative Friends of Israel which represent two thirds of Conservative parliamentarians.

== Founding ==
It was founded in May 2023 with the view of being a vehicle "to provide accurate and balanced information to parliamentarians on the issue of Palestine and Israel" and was originally intended to be named the Conservative Friends of Palestine and Israel to reflect this. The perceived lack of balance within the party led to its current name. Its founding was welcomed by Ben Jamal, the Director of the Palestine Solidarity Campaign stating that "any counter to the dominant voice of Conservative Friends of Israel in the Conservative Party is to be welcomed." It was founded as a "platform to engage and learn beyond the narrow remit" of Conservative Friends of Israel.

Since its founding it has engaged directly with the British-Israel and British-Palestinian communities and currently works with the pro-Palestinian Conservative Middle East Council to helping "lawmakers grasp the region as a whole."

A Conservative Friends of Palestine group was launched at a meeting addressed by the PLO's London representative, Faisal Oweida, at the Conservative Party Conference in Blackpool in October, 1989.

An unrelated, grass-root group founded in 2019 also previously existed with the same name but disbanded in late 2022, which Flick Drummond claims that she and Warsi "re-founded".

== Current parliamentary members ==
As of 2024, the parliamentary members of the group are:

MP	Constituency
Flick Drummond	Meon Valley
Richard Fuller	North East Bedfordshire
Leo Docherty	Aldershot
Jonathan Lord	Woking
Neil O'Brien	Harborough
Mark Pritchard	The Wrekin
Edward Leigh	Gainsborough

== See also ==
- Labour Friends of Israel
- Labour Friends of Palestine and the Middle East
- Conservative Friends of Israel
