= Andrew Feldman, Baron Feldman of Elstree =

British barrister, businessman, and Conservative fundraiser and politician

The Right Honourable The Lord Feldman of Elstree PC

Chairman of the Conservative Party
- In office 11 May 2010 – 14 July 2016; Served alongside The Baroness Warsi (2010–2012); Grant Shapps (2012–2015)
- Leader: David Cameron
- Preceded by: Eric Pickles
- Succeeded by: Patrick McLoughlin

Member of the House of Lords
- Lord Temporal
- Life peerage 17 December 2010

Personal details
- Born: 25 February 1966 (age 60) London, England, UK
- Party: Conservative
- Spouse: Gabrielle Gourgey
- Children: 3
- Education: Brasenose College, Oxford; City Law School

Andrew Simon Feldman, Baron Feldman of Elstree, PC (born 25 February 1966) is a British barrister, businessman and Conservative fundraiser and politician.

The Financial Times described Feldman as "David Cameron's oldest political friend" since their days together at Brasenose College, Oxford. Feldman was responsible for fundraising David Cameron's successful Tory leadership campaign in 2005.

He was created a life peer by David Cameron in 2010, and then Chairman of the Conservative Party, first as co-chairman alongside Sayeeda Warsi and then Grant Shapps between 2010 and 2015, then on his own as sole chairman from May 2015. His tenure ended after David Cameron's administration ended in July 2016.

== Early life and family ==
He was born into a Jewish family in London, the eldest son of Malcolm R Feldman (born 1939) and his wife Marcia J, née Summers (born 1944). His paternal grandmother was of Austrian descent.

He married Gabrielle Gourgey in 1999; they have two sons and one daughter. They live in a townhouse in Holland Park, just round the corner from David Cameron's pre-Downing Street family home in Notting Hill.

Feldman was educated at The Haberdashers' Aske's Boys' School, an independent school in Elstree in Hertfordshire, followed by Brasenose College at the University of Oxford, where he was awarded a first-class degree in jurisprudence. He went on to the Inns of Court School of Law.

Whilst at Oxford, he played for the Brasenose College tennis team, where he became friends with Cameron and Guy Spier. Feldman and Cameron together helped organise the college's May Ball in their second year. Feldman was chairman of the Ball committee, while Cameron booked the entertainment. Feldman has since remained a close confidant of Cameron, who gave him his own office in Downing Street.

== Business career ==
Feldman worked as a management consultant at Bain & Co before being called to the bar in 1991 and working as a commercial barrister at One Essex Court until 1995.

He subsequently worked for the family fashion firm, Jayroma (London) Ltd, serving as managing director and later chief executive.

He has donated to the Conservative Party through his company Jayroma the following amounts: £8,500 in 2008, £30,000 in 2009, £17,200 in 2010, £13,000 in 2011, £8,690 in 2012.

== David Cameron leadership campaign ==
With the encouragement and financial backing from Philip Harris, Baron Harris of Peckham, Feldman ran the operations and fundraising for David Cameron's 2005 leadership bid for the Conservative party.

Feldman himself gave £10,000 to Cameron's campaign from his family clothing company Jayroma and secured tens of thousands more from other business backers.

== Chief Executive of the Conservative Party ==
In July 2008 David Cameron promoted Feldman to Chief Executive of the Conservative Campaign Headquarters, a key role in preparing the Tories for the 2010 general election.

In October 2008, Feldman was embroiled in the "Yachtgate" scandal with George Osborne. Both he and Shadow Chancellor Osborne were guests on billionaire Oleg Deripaska's yacht off Corfu when Osborne was accused of soliciting a £50,000 donation to the party, which would have been a violation of the law against political donations by foreign citizens. This was when Feldman was Cameron's chief fundraiser. Both denied they had discussed soliciting donations from Deripaska, contrary to the claim made at the time by Nathaniel Rothschild who organised the party event.

In March 2016, Feldman was questioned by journalist Michael Crick about election expenses that may have broken the law.

== Chairman of the Conservative Party ==
After the Conservatives entered government with the Liberal Democrats on 11 May 2010, Cameron appointed Feldman as the co-chairman of the party, with Sayeeda Warsi. His being given an office in Downing Street is a privilege never bestowed before on a party chairman. One of his jobs was to strengthen the voluntary party and increase membership.

On 17 December 2010, Feldman was created a life peer as Baron Feldman of Elstree, of Elstree in the County of Hertfordshire; he was introduced in the House of Lords, where he sits as a Conservative, on 20 December 2010.

In 2012, Feldman helped Cameron prepare for the Leveson Inquiry by roleplaying the lead counsel of the inquiry Robert Jay QC.

Feldman was severely criticised by one of his Conservative councillors, Catherine Faulks, for failing to vote for her in the 2011 by-election for the Norland ward in Kensington and Chelsea Borough Council. Feldman claimed at the time that he was prohibited from voting as a member of the House of Lords, although this was a misunderstanding.

In May 2013, Feldman was widely attributed with making a claim that Conservative parliamentary rebellions on both a referendum on European Union membership and same sex marriage were due to Conservative Associations being "all mad, swivel-eyed loons", a claim that he has denied. The alleged words were claimed to have been said on the evening of Wednesday 15 May during a Conservative Friends of Pakistan event held in St James's, central London.

== Arms ==
Coat of arms of Andrew Feldman, Baron Feldman of Elstree

Crest
An owl Argent supporting with the dexter claws a menorah Or.
Escutcheon
Azure on a chevron between three rolls of cloth Argent three roses Gules barbed and seeded Proper.
Supporters
Dexter a bear Azure armed Or sinister a ram Azure armed and unguled Or each supporting with the interior foreleg a torch Gules flamed Proper.
Motto
Carpe Diem

Party political offices
Preceded by Eric Pickles	Chair of the Conservative Party; 2010–present Served alongside: The Baroness Warsi (2010–2012), Grant Shapps (2012–2015)	Succeeded by Patrick McLoughlin
Orders of precedence in the United Kingdom
Preceded by The Lord Lingfield	Gentlemen; Baron Feldman of Elstree	Followed by The Lord Dobbs
