= Sayeeda Warsi, Baroness Warsi =

British-Pakistani lawyer, politician and life peer (born 1971)

The Right Honourable The Baroness Warsi PC
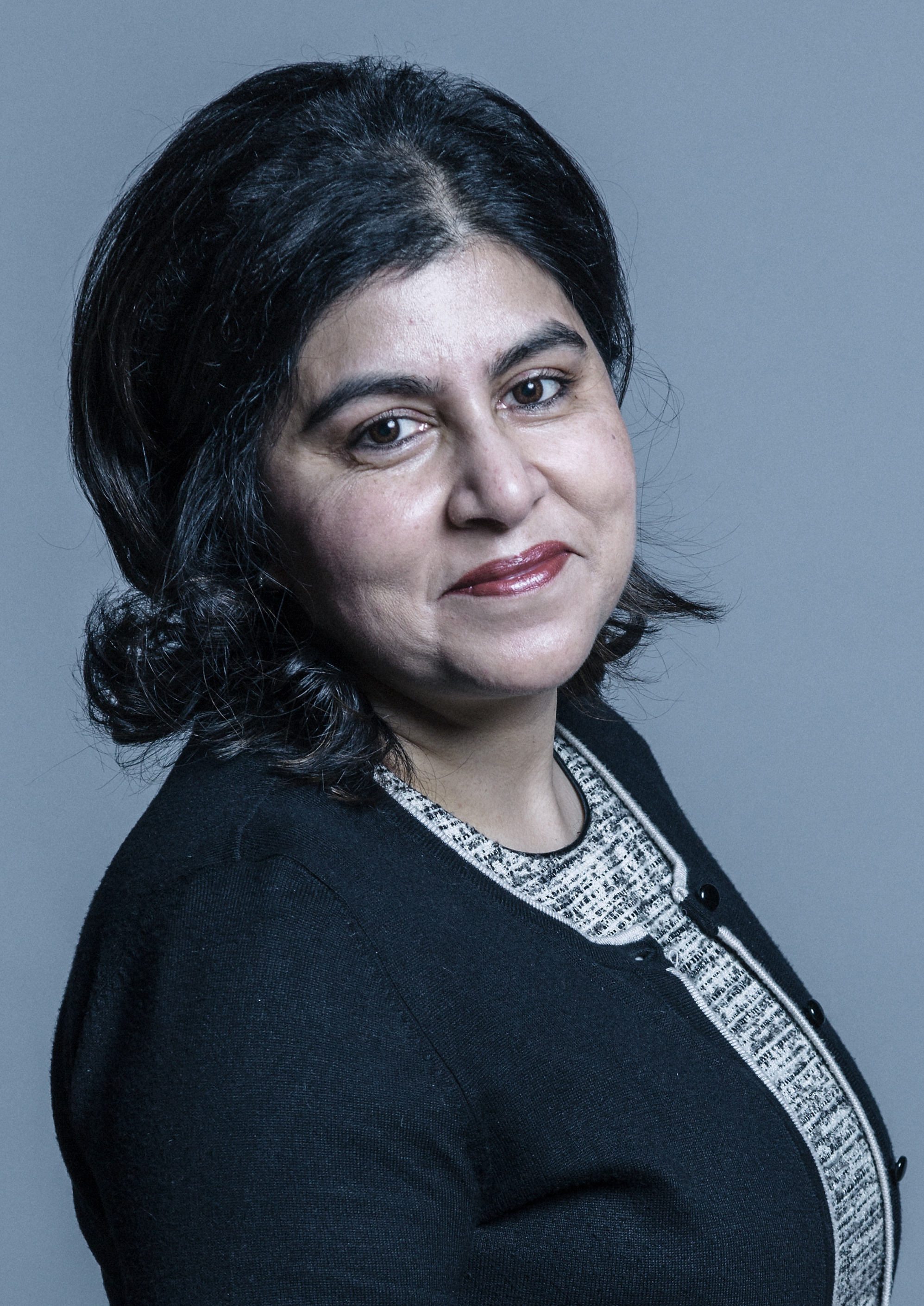
- Official portrait, 2018

Senior Minister of State for Foreign and Commonwealth Affairs
- In office 6 September 2012 – 5 August 2014
- Prime Minister: David Cameron
- Preceded by: The Lord Howell of Guildford
- Succeeded by: The Baroness Anelay of St Johns

Minister of State for Faith and Communities
- In office 6 September 2012 – 5 August 2014
- Prime Minister: David Cameron
- Preceded by: Office established
- Succeeded by: Eric Pickles

Minister without Portfolio
- In office 12 May 2010 – 6 September 2012
- Prime Minister: David Cameron
- Preceded by: Hazel Blears (Note: Office vacant from 2007 to 2010)
- Succeeded by: Ken Clarke; Grant Shapps

Chairwoman of the Conservative Party
- In office 12 May 2010 – 4 September 2012; Served with The Lord Feldman of Elstree
- Leader: David Cameron
- Preceded by: Eric Pickles
- Succeeded by: Grant Shapps

Shadow Minister for Community Cohesion and Social Action
- In office 2 July 2007 – 11 May 2010
- Leader: David Cameron
- Preceded by: Office established
- Succeeded by: Office abolished

Member of the House of Lords
- Lord Temporal
- Life peerage 11 October 2007

Personal details
- Born: Sayeeda Hussain Warsi; 28 March 1971 (age 55) Dewsbury, West Yorkshire, England
- Party: Conservative (Note: Resigned party whip in 2024.)
- Spouses: Naeem (m. 1990; div. 2007); Iftikhar Azam (m. 2009)
- Children: 5
- Education: University of Leeds (LLB); University of Law (LPC)
- Website: sayeedawarsi.com

Sayeeda Hussain Warsi, Baroness Warsi (/ˈvɑːrsiː/; born 28 March 1971) is a British politician, lawyer, and member of the House of Lords who served as co-chairwoman of the Conservative Party from 2010 to 2012. She served in the Cameron–Clegg coalition, first as the Minister without portfolio between 2010 and 2012, then as the Minister of State for the Foreign and Commonwealth Office (styled as "Senior Minister of State") and as the Minister of State for Faith and Communities, until her resignation, citing her disagreement with the Government's policy relating to the Israel–Gaza conflict in August 2014. In September 2024, Baroness Warsi resigned the Whip and left the Conservative Party.

Warsi grew up in a family of Pakistani Muslim immigrants living in West Yorkshire. She became a solicitor with the Crown Prosecution Service (CPS). In 2004, she left the CPS to stand, unsuccessfully, for election to the House of Commons. After being raised to the peerage in 2007, Warsi served as Shadow Minister for Community Cohesion and Social Action. She became the first Muslim to serve as a Cabinet Minister.

On 26 September 2024, Warsi announced that she would no longer take the Conservative Party whip in the House of Lords.

== Early life and career ==
Warsi is the granddaughter of two men who served in the British Indian Army. She is the second of five daughters born in Dewsbury, West Riding of Yorkshire, to Pakistani immigrants from Bewal, Kallar Syedan. Her father is the owner of a bed manufacturing company, who started his working life as a mill worker and a bus driver. Warsi has said that her father's success led her to adopting Conservative principles.

Warsi was educated at Birkdale High School, Dewsbury College (now Kirklees College), and the University of Leeds. She attended the College of Law, York (now the University of Law), and completed her professional legal training thereafter with both the Crown Prosecution Service and the Home Office Immigration Department. After qualifying as a solicitor in 1996, she worked for the Conservative MP for Dewsbury, John Whitfield, at Whitfield Hallam Goodall Solicitors, and then set up a practice in Dewsbury.

== Political career ==
Warsi was the Conservative parliamentary candidate for Dewsbury at the 2005 general election, having been added to the Conservative Party A-List for priority candidates, and thereby becoming the first Muslim woman to be selected by the Conservatives. She placed second with Labour retaining the seat. Following the election, she served as a Special Adviser to Michael Howard for Community Relations and was appointed by David Cameron as Vice Chair of the Conservative Party with specific responsibility for cities.

=== Introduction to the House of Lords ===
On 2 July 2007, Warsi was appointed Shadow Minister for Community Cohesion. To enable her to fulfil this post, she was created a life peer as Baroness Warsi, of Dewsbury in the County of West Yorkshire, on 11 October 2007 and was introduced in the House of Lords on 15 October 2007. On joining the House of Lords, she became its youngest member.

On 1 December 2007, Warsi travelled to Khartoum with the Labour peer Lord Ahmed to mediate in the Sudanese teddy bear blasphemy case. Prime Minister Gordon Brown commended both peers for their efforts regarding the issue.

=== Positions in the Cameron Ministry ===
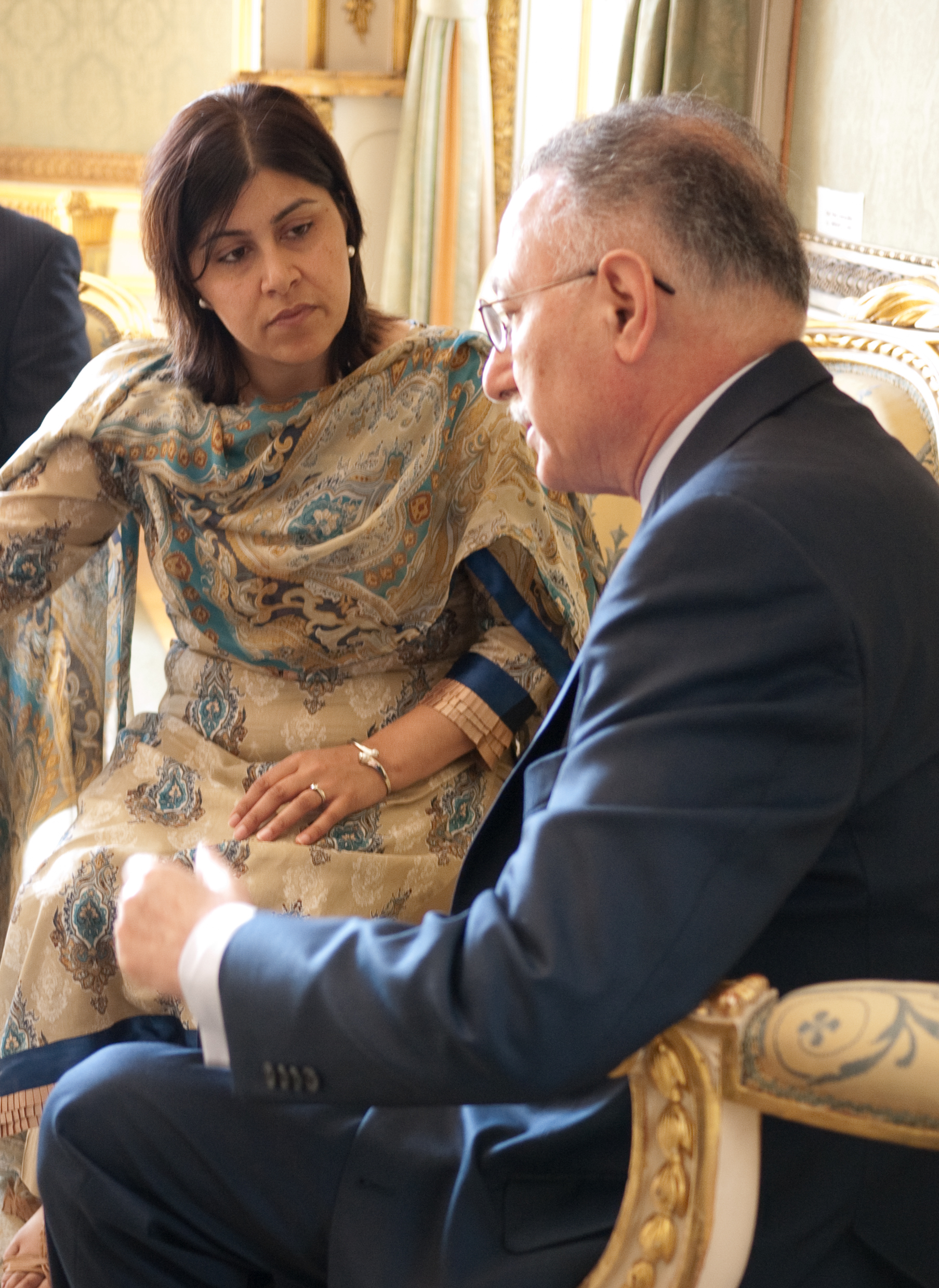
Lady Warsi with Ekmeleddin İhsanoğlu, Secretary-General of the Organisation of Islamic Cooperation in 2010

On 12 May 2010, David Cameron appointed Warsi as Minister without Portfolio in Cabinet, when she succeeded Eric Pickles as Chairman of the Conservative Party, which she held jointly with Andrew Feldman. This appointment made Warsi the first Muslim woman to serve in the Cabinet. Warsi was sworn into the Privy Council the next day.

In September 2012, David Cameron conducted his first Cabinet reshuffle. Despite wishing to remain in the role, during the reshuffle Warsi was replaced as Chairwoman of the Conservative Party by Grant Shapps. While Warsi was offered a cabinet position without a ministry, she turned down the offer, concerned it would appear tokenistic. Instead she requested a ministerial position. Warsi was appointed to the restyled post of Senior Minister of State for Foreign and Commonwealth Affairs, and to the post of Minister for Faith and Communities in the Department of Communities and Local Government—a role created specifically for her in a ministry she had shadowed in Opposition.

==== Minister of State ====
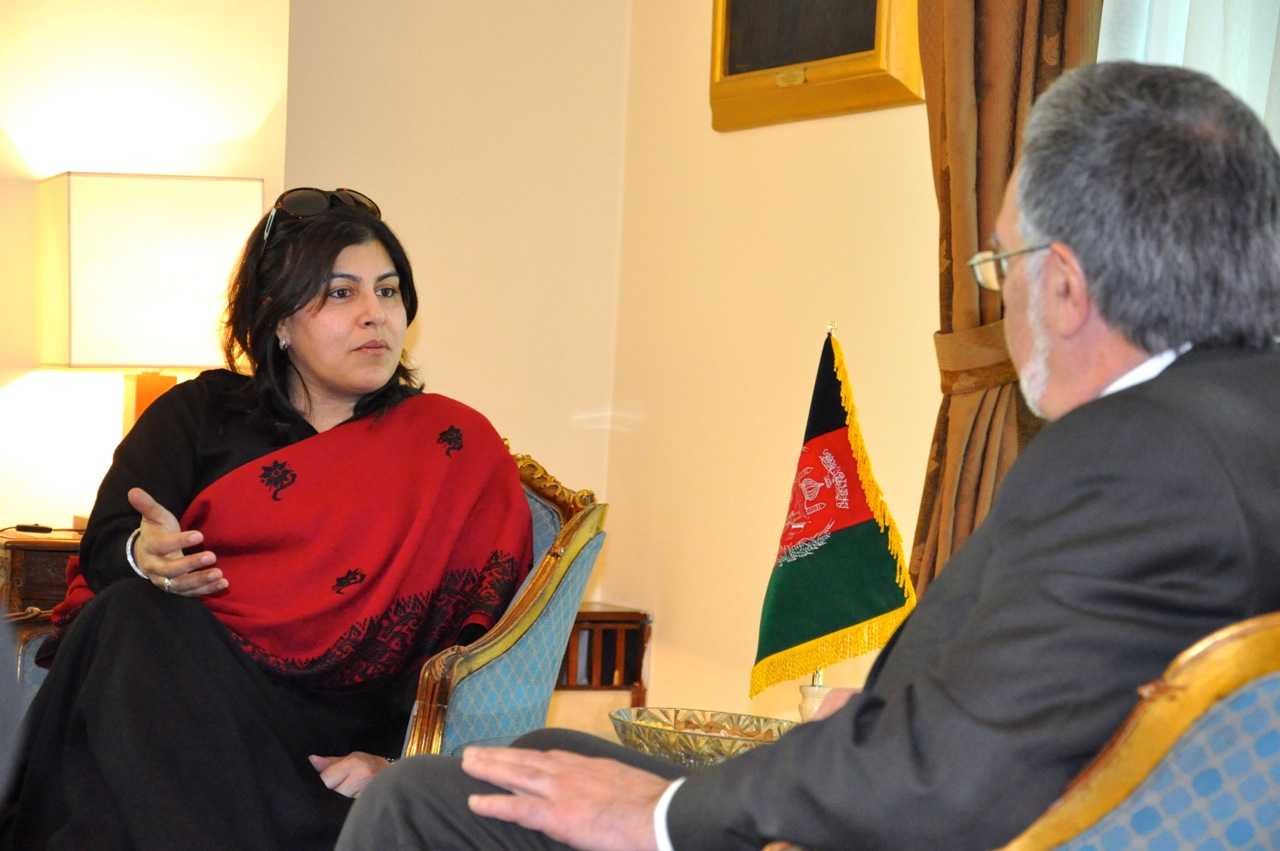
Lady Warsi meeting Afghanistan's Foreign Minister Rassoul in Kabul in 2013

At the Foreign and Commonwealth Office she was responsible for country-specific policies concerning Afghanistan, Pakistan and Bangladesh along with international organisations. In addition she was responsible for leading Foreign and Commonwealth Office business in the House of Lords

At the Department for Communities and Local Government Lady Warsi worked with religious and community leaders to promote faith, religious tolerance and stronger communities within the UK.

Warsi established and co-chaired HM Government's first Ministerial Task Force on Islamic Finance. At the World Islamic Economic Forum, the UK Government announced that Warsi would chair a new Global Islamic Finance and Investment Group.

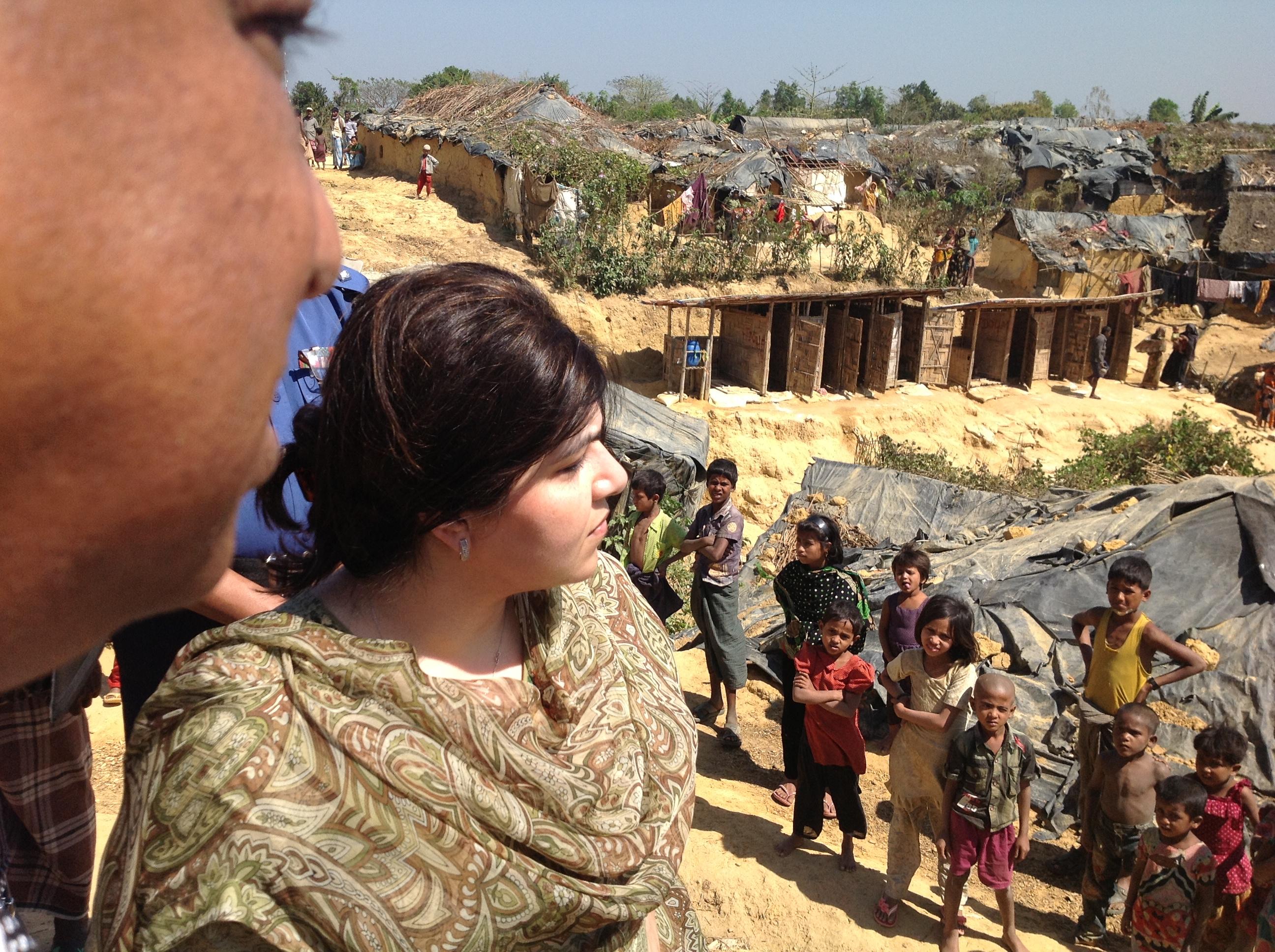
Warsi at Kutupalong Refugee Camp for Rohingya in Bangladesh in 2013.

In a public speech in Washington, D.C. in 2013, Warsi highlighted persecution of Christians in parts of the world.

=== Resignation from government ===
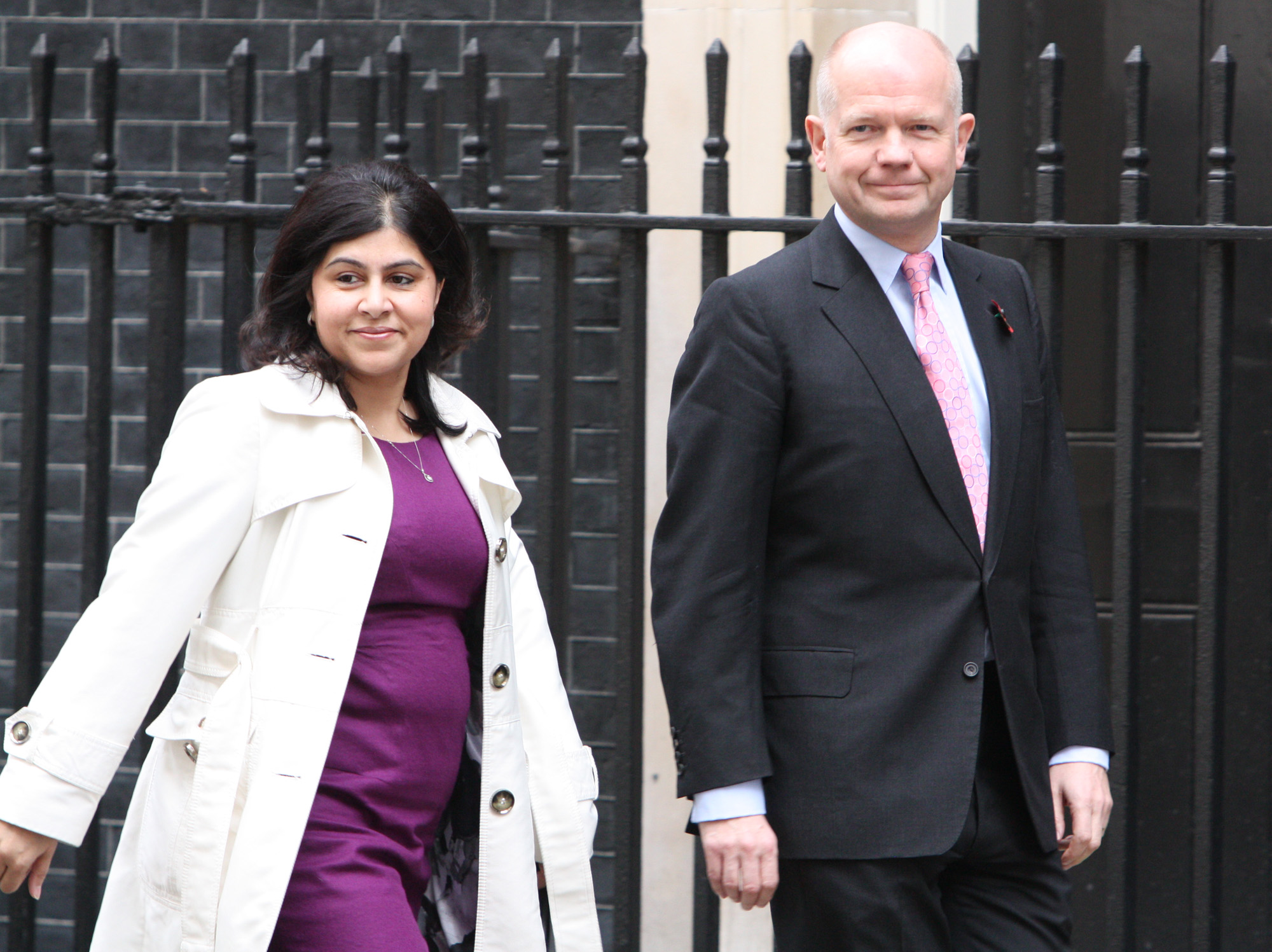
Warsi leaves 10 Downing Street with William Hague in 2012.

On 5 August 2014, Warsi resigned from the Government citing concerns that she was no longer able to support the Cameron Government's policy on the escalation of violence in the 2014 Israel–Gaza War. In her resignation letter, she described the Government's policy as "morally indefensible" and "not consistent with the rule of law." After resigning she called for an arms embargo against Israel." She also expressed concern about the way recent decisions had been made in the Foreign Office, as well as the Conservatives' refusal to recognise the State of Palestine. Warsi described the tipping point for her resignation was David Cameron's refusal to condemn Israeli shelling that killed four Palestinian children as they were playing football.

=== Post-Government ===
On 11 March 2024, The Guardian reported that Conservative Party donor Frank Hester said in 2019 that Labour MP Diane Abbott made him "want to hate all black women" and that "she should be shot". Hester apologised to Abbott on Twitter after the article published, stating that his comments were "rude" and had "nothing to do with her gender nor colour of skin". Following Rishi Sunak's refusal to hand back Hester's donations or strip Hester of Party membership, on 17 March Warsi described the party as "institutionally xenophobic and racist". Speaking also of the time taken to suspend MP Lee Anderson, Warsi stated that Sunak's judgement in both cases "appears to be delayed and appears to be wrong."

On 26 September 2024, Warsi resigned the Conservative Whip in the House of Lords citing concerns of double standards against minorities within the party, that the Conservatives had moved far right.

== Views ==
=== Gay rights ===
The gay rights organisation Stonewall, along with several Labour politicians, questioned her suitability for a high-profile Conservative Party role, owing to leaflets issued during her 2005 election campaign that claimed that lowering the age of consent in 2001 had "[allowed] school children to be propositioned for homosexual relationships" and that homosexuality "undermines family life". Warsi described the contents of the leaflets as "fact". On a 2009 episode of Question Time, Warsi was supportive of same-sex civil partnerships. Speaking in December 2013 at a BNP Paribas event in support of Kaleidoscope Trust, she apologised for her leaflets and said the Conservative Party had been "on the wrong side of history" on gay rights.

=== Islam ===
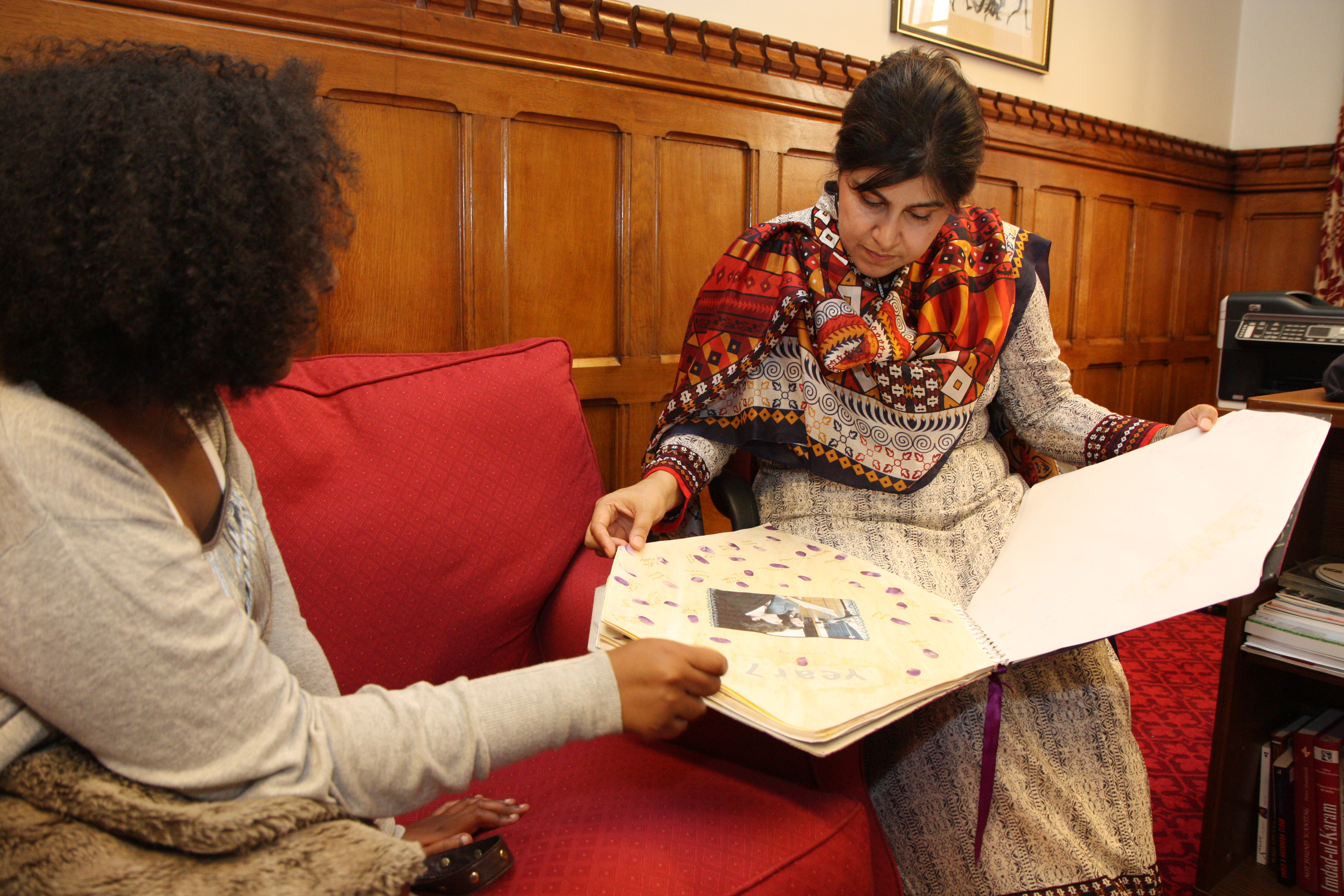
Lady Warsi with Amnesty youth activists who handed over a petition on Afghan women's rights in 2013.

Following a confrontation in November 2009 by a group of protestors in Luton accusing her of not being a proper Muslim, a man was jailed for six weeks for a public order offence of throwing an egg at Warsi.

Warsi argued against following the example of France by banning Muslim women from wearing the veil, as this was "not the British way", although she commented that those who choose to wear garments such as the full-face veil must accept that there are some situations in which it is not appropriate.

In 2009, she was named as "Britain's most powerful Muslim woman" by an Equality and Human Rights Commission panel and in 2010 as one of the world's "500 most influential Muslims" by the Royal Islamic Strategic Studies Centre, a Middle East think tank.

In the April 2016 issue of Dabiq magazine, The Islamic State of Iraq and the Levant declared her a murtadd (or apostate) for being among a group of "overt crusaders" who "directly involve themselves in politics and enforcing the laws of kufr".

In February 2018, Warsi received a front-page apology and a payout of £20,000 over a claim in an opinion piece in the UK publication Jewish News that she had sought to excuse the conduct of the Islamic State terrorist group.

=== Brexit ===
On 20 June 2016, three days before the referendum on membership of the European Union, Warsi said that she could no longer support the Leave campaign because of what she claimed was its xenophobia, and would vote to remain within the EU. A spokesman for Vote Leave said that they were not aware that Warsi had ever been a supporter.

=== Islamophobia ===
In May 2018, Warsi stated that the Prime Minister, Theresa May should publicly acknowledge that Islamophobia was a problem in the Conservative Party and that the party was in denial about the problem."

In July that year, a week after the Muslim Council of Britain repeated its call for an independent inquiry into Islamophobia and accused the Conservatives of turning a blind eye to Islamophobia claims, Warsi called on the Conservatives to launch a "full independent inquiry" into Islamophobia in the party. She accused Conservative Chair Brandon Lewis of a "woefully inept" response to recent complaints and added that MP Zac Goldsmith should receive "mandatory diversity training" following his unsuccessful attempt to beat Sadiq Khan to become Mayor of London.

=== Church and society ===
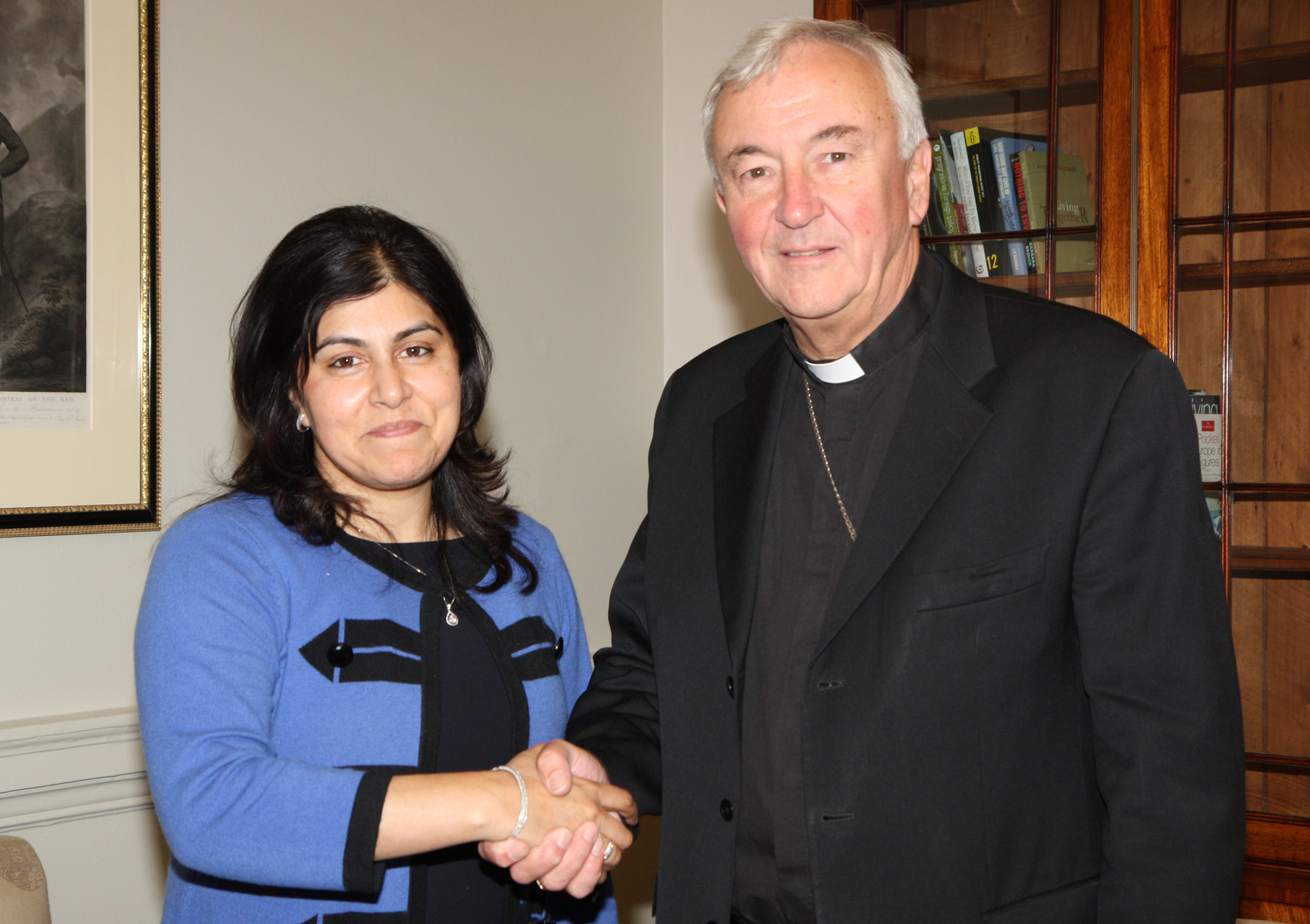
Warsi and Cardinal Nichols in 2012

In September 2010, during the visit of Pope Benedict XVI to England and Scotland, Warsi said the Labour Government appeared to have viewed religion as "essentially a rather quaint relic of our pre-industrial history. They were also too suspicious of faith's potential for contributing to society – behind every faith-based charity, they sensed the whiff of conversion and exclusivity. And because of these prejudices they didn't create policies to unleash the positive power of faith in our society."

She returned to this theme, as a Cabinet minister, in February 2012, saying "Britain is under threat from a rising tide of militant secularisation", before an official visit to the Vatican to mark the 30th anniversary of the re-establishment of full diplomatic ties between the UK and the Vatican.

She added, "I am not calling for some kind of 21st century theocracy. Religious faith and its followers do not have the only answer. There will be times when politicians and faith leaders will disagree. What is more, secularism is not intrinsically damaging. My concern is when secularisation is pushed to an extreme, when it requires the complete removal of faith from the public sphere". A Muslim herself, Warsi says that Europe needs to be "more confident and more comfortable in its Christianity".

On the Church of England, she insists she had "no doubts whatsoever" about maintaining its position as the Established Church, describing it as a "bedrock" of society. She believes "the system works": "We have an Established Church", it has "a unique position" and an "obligation to all of its parishioners irrespective of their faith". She thinks "it is an incredibly positive aspect of our life in Britain and long may it continue."

In November 2013, Warsi told an audience at the University of Cambridge that faith was being put back at the "heart of government", as it had been under Winston Churchill and Margaret Thatcher. The Coalition, she argued, is one of the "most pro-faith governments in the West ... More often than not, people who do God do good." She said that religious groups must be allowed to provide public services without the State being "suspicious of their motives". Quoting Thatcher she said, "I wonder whether the State services would have done as much for the man who fell among thieves as the Good Samaritan did for him?"

== Controversies ==
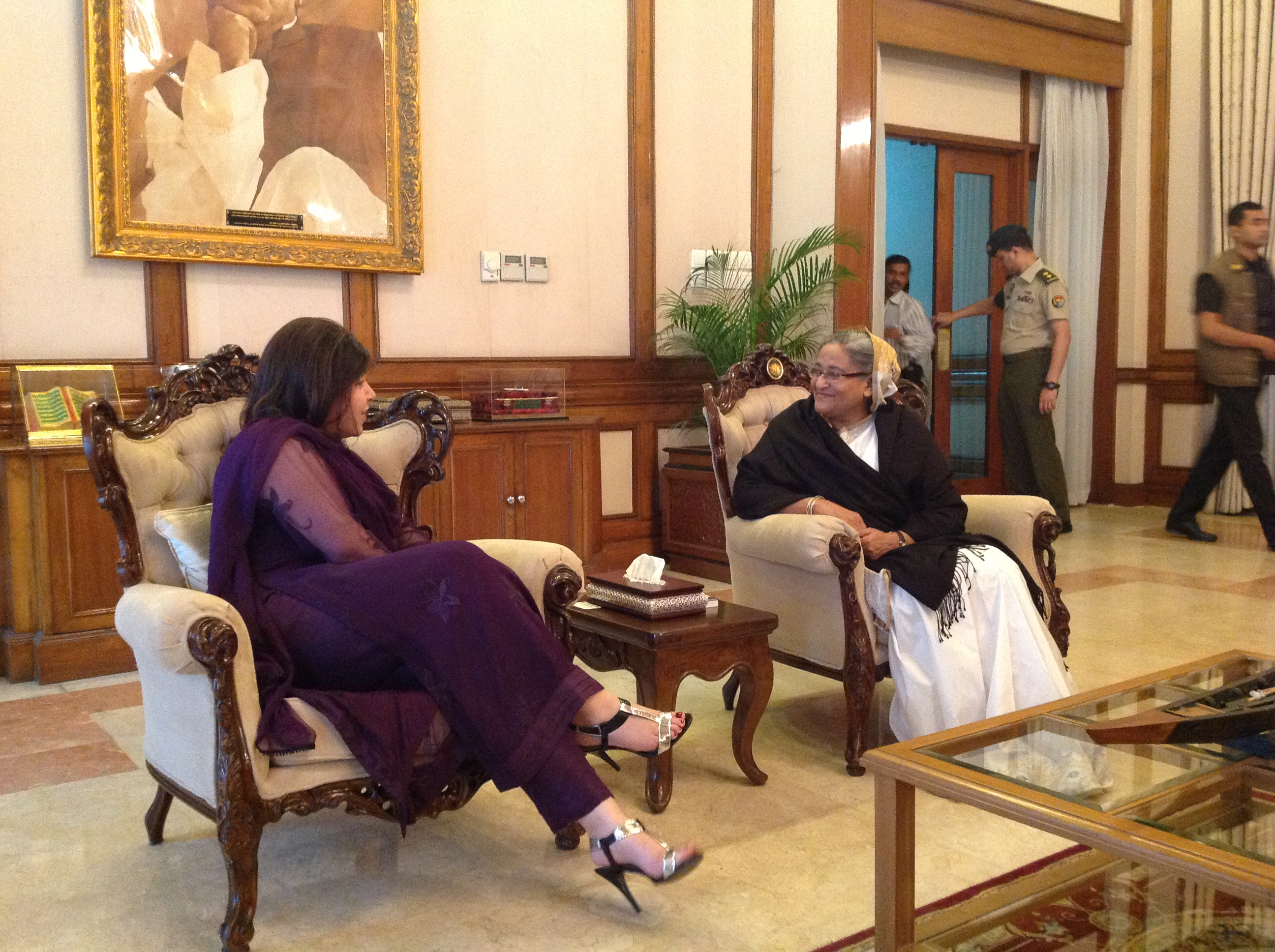
Lady Warsi meets with Bangladesh Prime Minister Sheikh Hasina in 2013.

=== Financial declarations ===
In May 2012, Warsi apologised for failing to declare rental income in the Lords' Register of Interests. Declaring the fact of income, but not the amount, is necessary for rental income over £5,000.

=== Parliamentary expenses inquiry ===
On 27 May 2012, criticisms of her claims for parliamentary expenses were reported. The Labour Opposition urged a full police investigation into her expenses after it was alleged that she claimed up to £2,000 in rent despite staying rent-free in the London home of a Conservative Party donor, Dr Wafik Moustafa. Moustafa claims that he received no money from Warsi. Though he stated it was not personal, Moustafa was in a political dispute with Warsi concerning the Conservative Arab Network.

Labour MP John Mann expressed his intention to refer these claims to the Lords Commissioner for Standards, but Warsi pre-empted this by referring them herself.

=== Breach of the Ministerial Code ===
Sir Alex Allan found Warsi to have twice breached the Ministerial Code, though he concluded these were minor and noted that she had apologised. The first was in relation to a trip to Pakistan where she failed to declare that she was being accompanied by a business partner but Sir Alex found that even were Baroness Warsi to have declared the relationship it would not have prevented the trip from going ahead. The second was when she invited her business partner (Abid Hussain) to meet David Cameron at a Number 10 Downing Street Eid event.

The Conservative Party leadership was criticised in some quarters for holding Baroness Warsi to account on the Ministerial Code while apparently having a more relaxed approach to Jeremy Hunt, who was Culture Secretary at that time. Following the publication of the report, David Cameron said Baroness Warsi would remain in her job.

== Activities outside of politics ==
Warsi is a Pro Vice-Chancellor of the University of Bolton, having been appointed in 2016.

== Personal life ==
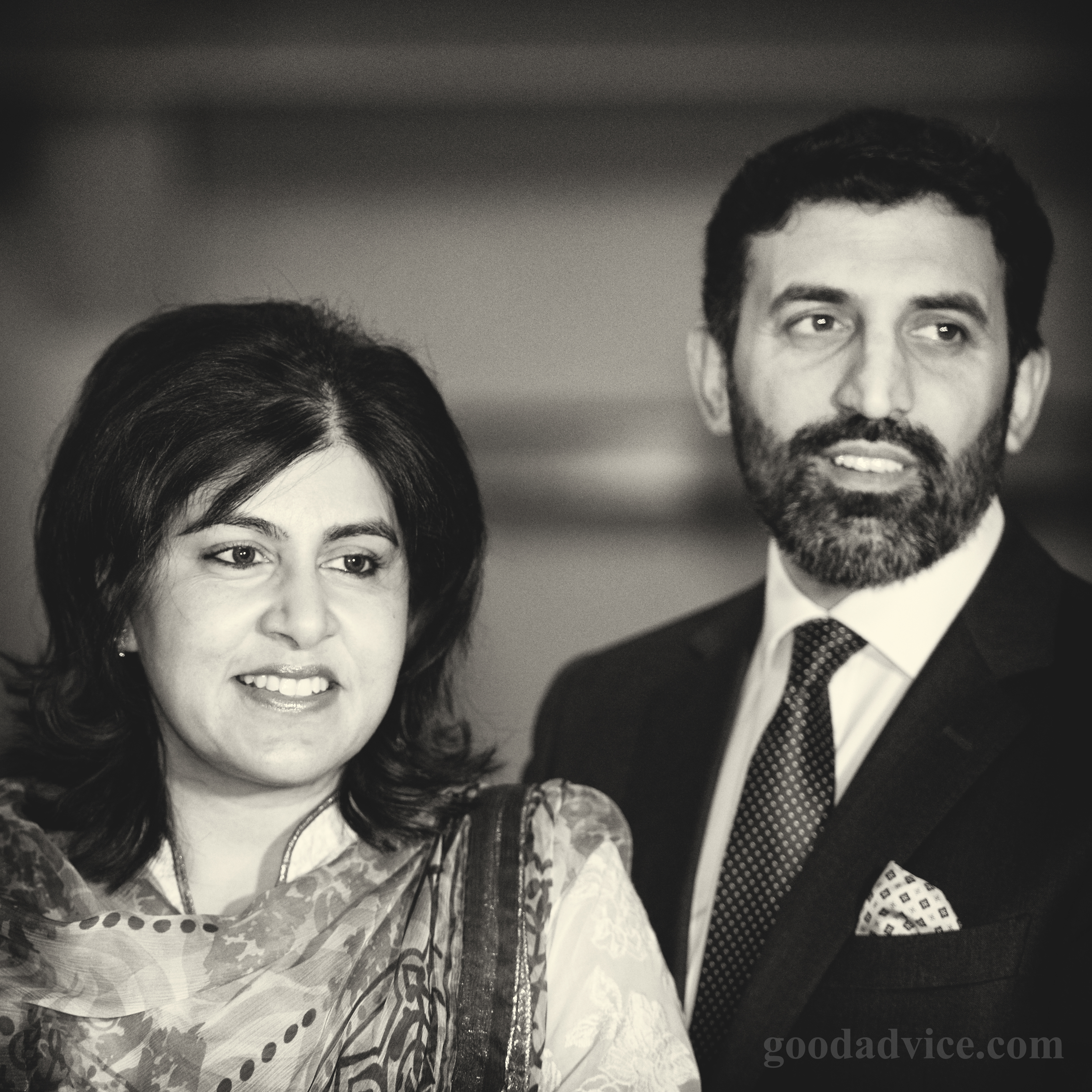
Sayeeda Warsi and Iftikhar Azam

At the age of 15, when on holiday with her extended family in Pakistan, a number of boys were introduced to her, and from them she chose her cousin Naeem. They married in 1990 and had a daughter. Naeem later denied that the marriage had been arranged. They divorced in December 2007.

Warsi describes herself as a "Northern working-class mum". She is a member of the Carlton Club, and a shareholder of Rupert's Recipes Limited and Shire Bed Company. On 20 August 2009, she married Iftikhar Azam in a nikah ceremony at her parents' house in Dewsbury. The couple live in Wakefield with their five children.

She set up the Baroness Warsi Foundation to fund projects that seek to improve social mobility, increase gender equality and promote religious understanding.

In addition to the English language, Warsi is fluent in Punjabi, Urdu and Gujarati.

=== Notable television appearances ===
In December 2016, Warsi took a cameo role in the BBC One sitcom Citizen Khan. In 2022, she appeared alongside Alastair Campbell as one of the political experts on Channel 4's Make Me Prime Minister. She also took part in a special episode of comedy panel show Taskmaster which aired on a New Year's Day 2022.

== Works ==
- The Enemy Within: A Tale of Muslim Britain (Penguin, 2018) ISBN 978-0241276037
- Muslims Don't Matter (Little, Brown Book Group, 2024) ISBN 9780349136479

== Awards and nominations ==
In January 2015, Warsi was nominated for the Muslim Woman of the Year award at the British Muslim Awards.

=== Honours ===
- She was given a Life Peerage on 11 October 2007 allowing her to sit in the House of Lords. She was introduced in the House of Lords on 15 October 2007. She took the title of Baroness Warsi, of Dewsbury in the County of West Yorkshire.

=== Commonwealth honours ===
Commonwealth honours

Country	Date	Appointment	Post-nominal letters
United Kingdom	13 May 2010 – Present	Member of His Majesty's Most Honourable Privy Council	PC

=== Foreign honours ===
Foreign honours

Country	Date	Appointment	Post-nominal letters
Pakistan	23 March 2020 – Present	Commander of the Order of Pakistan	

=== Scholastic ===
University degrees

Location	Date	School	Degree
England	1987 – 1989	Dewsbury College	
England	1992	University of Leeds	Bachelor of Laws (LL.B)
England		The College of Law, York	Legal Practice Course (LPC)

Chancellor, visitor, governor, and fellowships

Location	Date	School	Position
England	September 2015 –	St Mary's University, Twickenham	Visiting Professor
England	13 January 2016 –	University of Bolton	Pro-vice-chancellor
England		Bolton College	Governor

Honorary degrees

Location	Date	School	Degree	Gave Commencement Address
England	24 July 2015	Aston University	Doctor of Letters (D.Litt.)	
England	July 2015	University of Bolton	Doctor of Social Science (D.SSc.)	
England	April 2017	University of Law	Doctorate	
England	January 2018	Birmingham City University	Doctorate	

=== Memberships and fellowships ===
Country	Date	Organisation	Position
United Kingdom	2010 – Present	Carlton Club	Honorary Member
United Kingdom	January 2017 – Present	Council for Arab-British Understanding (Caabu)	Patron
United Kingdom	2018 – 2023	The Yorkshire Sculpture Park	Member of the Board of Trustees
United Kingdom	3 December 2021 – Present	The Yorkshire Society	Vice President
United Kingdom	2023 – Present	Conservative Friends of Palestine	Chairman

== Notes ==
Political offices
New office	Shadow Minister for Community Cohesion and Social Action; 2007–2010	Position abolished
Preceded by Hazel Blears	Minister without Portfolio; 2010–2012	Succeeded by Grant Shapps; Ken Clarke
Preceded by Hazel Blears	Minister of State for Faith and Communities; 2012–2014	Succeeded by Eric Pickles as Minister of State for Faith
Preceded by The Lord Howell of Guildford	Senior Minister of State for Foreign and Commonwealth Affairs; 2012–2014	Succeeded by The Baroness Anelay of St John's
Party political offices
Preceded by Eric Pickles	Chairman of the Conservative Party; 2010–2012; Served alongside: The Lord Feldman of Elstree	Succeeded by Grant Shapps; The Lord Feldman of Elstree
