= Grant Shapps =

British politician (born 1968)

The Right Honourable Sir Grant Shapps
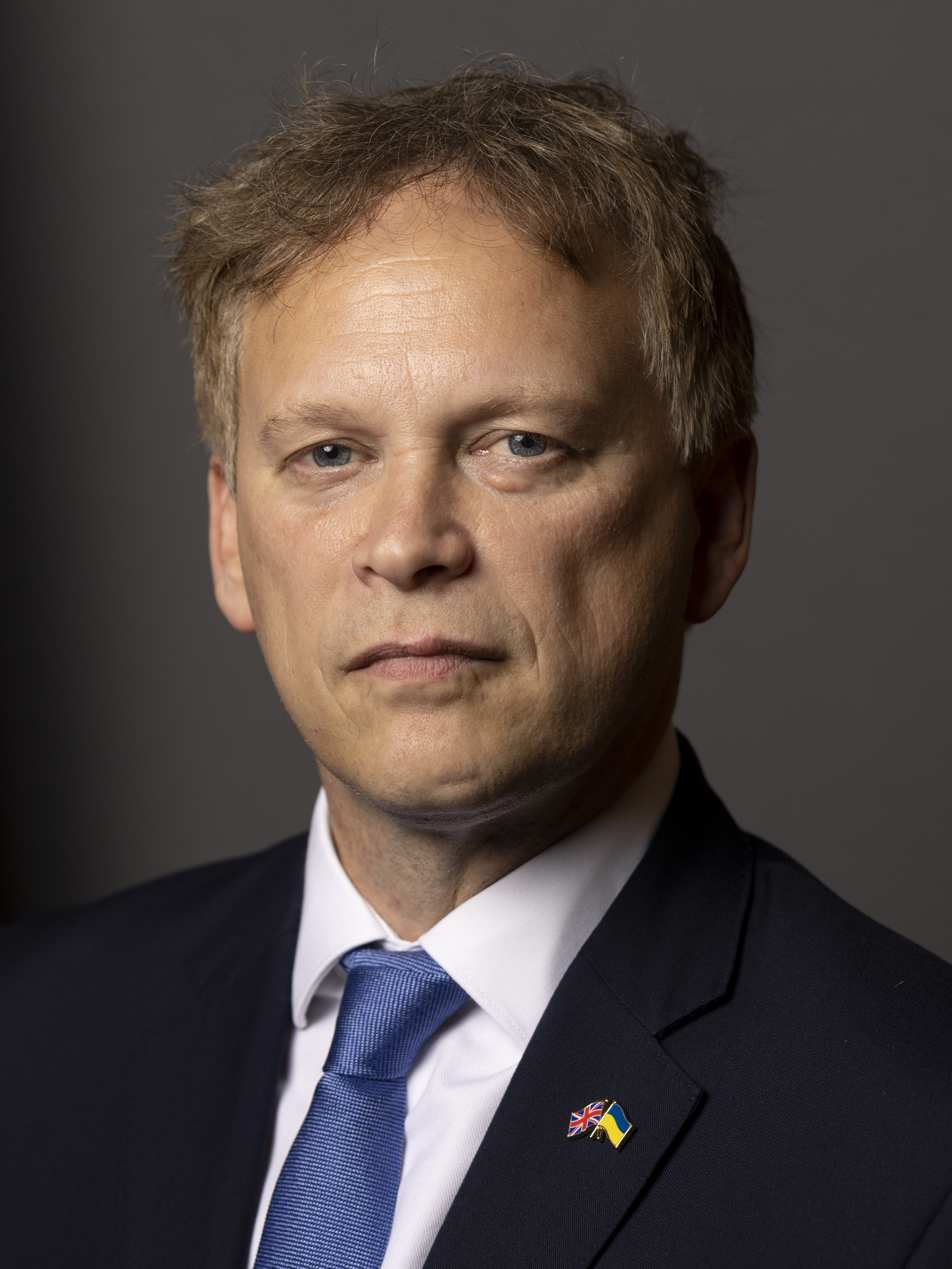
- Official portrait, 2022

Secretary of State for Defence
- In office 31 August 2023 – 5 July 2024
- Prime Minister: Rishi Sunak
- Preceded by: Ben Wallace
- Succeeded by: John Healey

Secretary of State for Energy Security and Net Zero
- In office 7 February 2023 – 31 August 2023
- Prime Minister: Rishi Sunak
- Preceded by: Office established
- Succeeded by: Claire Coutinho

Secretary of State for Business, Energy and Industrial Strategy
- In office 25 October 2022 – 7 February 2023
- Prime Minister: Rishi Sunak
- Preceded by: Jacob Rees-Mogg
- Succeeded by: Kemi Badenoch (Note: As Secretary of State for Business and Trade.)

Home Secretary
- In office 19 October 2022 – 25 October 2022
- Prime Minister: Liz Truss
- Preceded by: Suella Braverman
- Succeeded by: Suella Braverman
Past ministerial positions
Secretary of State for Transport
In office 24 July 2019 – 6 September 2022
Prime Minister	Boris Johnson
Preceded by	Chris Grayling
Succeeded by	Anne-Marie Trevelyan
Minister without portfolio
In office 4 September 2012 – 11 May 2015
Prime Minister	David Cameron
Preceded by	The Baroness Warsi
Succeeded by	Robert Halfon
Junior ministerial positions
Minister of State for International Development
In office 11 May 2015 – 28 November 2015
Prime Minister	David Cameron
Preceded by	Desmond Swayne
Succeeded by	Nick Hurd
Minister of State for Housing and Local Government
In office 13 May 2010 – 4 September 2012
Prime Minister	David Cameron
Preceded by	John Healey (Housing); Rosie Winterton (Local Government)
Succeeded by	Mark Prisk
Shadow portfolios
Shadow Minister for Housing and Planning
In office 20 December 2007 – 6 May 2010
Leader	David Cameron
Preceded by	Michael Gove
Succeeded by	John Healey
Party political offices
Chairman of the Conservative Party
In office 4 September 2012 – 11 May 2015 Serving with The Lord Feldman of Elstree
Leader	David Cameron
Preceded by	The Baroness Warsi
Succeeded by	The Lord Feldman of Elstree

Member of Parliament for Welwyn Hatfield
- In office 5 May 2005 – 30 May 2024
- Preceded by: Melanie Johnson
- Succeeded by: Andrew Lewin

Personal details
- Born: 14 September 1968 (age 58) Croxley Green, Hertfordshire, England
- Party: Conservative
- Spouse: Belinda Goldstone (m. 1997)
- Children: 3
- Education: Manchester Polytechnic (HND)
- Grant Shapps's voice Shapps's first public address as home secretary Recorded 21 October 2022

Sir Grant Shapps (born 14 September 1968) is a British politician who served in various cabinet positions under Prime Ministers David Cameron, Boris Johnson, Liz Truss and Rishi Sunak between 2012 and 2024, lastly as Secretary of State for Defence from August 2023 to July 2024. Shapps served as Conservative Party Co-chairman from 2010 to 2012 under Cameron, Transport Secretary from 2019 to 2022 under Johnson, and briefly as Home Secretary in 2022 under Truss. Under Sunak, he served as Business Secretary, Energy Secretary and later Defence Secretary. A member of the Conservative Party, he was the Member of Parliament (MP) for Welwyn Hatfield from 2005 to 2024.

Born in Croxley Green, Shapps attended Watford Grammar School for Boys and West Herts College. He studied at Manchester Polytechnic and was national president of BBYO. He began his career as a photocopier sales representative and then worked in business, founding several of his own companies. Shapps stood as a councillor for the Manchester City Council in 1990 and then for the London Borough of Brent in 1994 but was unsuccessful both times. He stood for Parliament in 1997 for the North Southwark and Bermondsey constituency but was defeated. After an unsuccessful 2001 general election candidacy, Shapps was elected MP for Welwyn Hatfield at the 2005 general election. In 2007, he was promoted to the Shadow Cabinet as Shadow Minister for Housing and Planning. After the Conservative party's victory in the 2010 general election, he was appointed to the government as Minister of State for Housing and Local Government.

In the 2012 cabinet reshuffle he was promoted to the Cabinet as Co-chairman of the Conservative Party and Minister without portfolio. In May 2015, Cameron demoted him from cabinet, with Shapps being appointed Minister of State for International Development. In November 2015, he stood down from this post due to his handling of allegations of bullying within the Conservative Party. In 2019, Shapps endorsed Boris Johnson's successful 2019 Conservative leadership bid and subsequently returned to cabinet as Transport Secretary. He exercised greater influence than any of his predecessors in the position. During his tenure, he oversaw the effective nationalisation of the Northern Trains franchise, the Williams–Shapps Review to move from a rail franchise system to concessionary Great British Railways public body (from 2023), and the Integrated Rail Plan published in 2021 which set out the long-term strategy for rail in northern England and the Midlands. After the resignation of Johnson in July 2022, Shapps announced his candidacy in a leadership bid to replace Johnson, but eventually withdrew and endorsed Rishi Sunak.

In September 2022, Shapps was dismissed by the government by Truss and he returned to the backbenches. The following month, Shapps was appointed Home Secretary by Truss amid a government crisis. He became the shortest-serving home secretary in British political history, holding the office for just six days before he was demoted to Business Secretary by Sunak. In the February 2023 cabinet reshuffle, he was appointed Energy Secretary. Following the resignation of Ben Wallace, he was promoted to Defence Secretary in August 2023. After serving in Parliament for nineteen years, Shapps was defeated at the 2024 general election, losing his seat to the Labour party. In April 2025, Shapps was awarded a knighthood in Sunak's Resignation Honours List. Since leaving Parliament, he has remained involved in Conservative party politics, serving as co-chairman of Conservatives Together, but was reportedly blocked from restanding as a Conservative MP under the leadership of Kemi Badenoch.

== Early life and education ==
Grant Shapps was born on 14 September 1968 in Croxley Green, Rickmansworth, Hertfordshire, the son of Tony Shapps (c.1932–2023), who ran a cinematographic and photographic equipment business, and Beryl (née Grossman). His family is Jewish. Grant's brother, André Shapps, is a musician who was a member of Big Audio Dynamite (BAD) between 1994 and 1998, playing keyboards. Their cousin Mick Jones was a key figure in British punk rock of the late 1970s and a founding member of both the Clash and Big Audio Dynamite.

Grant Shapps was educated at Yorke Mead Primary School, Watford Grammar School for Boys, where he achieved 5 'O' Levels, and at West Herts College in Watford, where he studied business and finance. He subsequently completed a business and finance course at Manchester Polytechnic, and received a Higher National Diploma.

Shapps was also National President of the Jewish youth organisation BBYO. In 1989, he was involved in a car crash in Kansas, United States, that left him in a coma for a week.

== Business ventures ==
Shapps started his working life as a photocopier sales representative. In 1990, aged 22, Shapps founded PrintHouse Corporation, a design, print, website creation and marketing business in London, based on a collapsed printing business he purchased from the receiver. He stepped down as a director in 2009, but remained the majority shareholder.

Shapps founded a web publishing business, How To Corp Limited, with his wife while he was recovering from cancer. The company marketed business publications and software. The existence of at least three people who allegedly provided testimonials for the company has been questioned. Shapps stood down as a director in July 2008; his wife remained as director until the company was dissolved in 2014.

In September 2012, Google blacklisted 19 of Shapps's business websites for violating rules on copyright infringement related to the web scraping-based TrafficPayMaster software sold by them. Shapps's web marketing business's 20/20 Challenge publication also drew criticism. It cost $497 and promised customers earnings of $20,000 in 20 days. Upon purchase, the "toolkit" was revealed to be an ebook, advising the user to create their own toolkit and recruit 100 "Joint Venture Partners" to resell it for a share of the profits.

Shapps's use of the names Michael Green, Corinne Stockheath and Sebastian Fox attracted media attention in 2012. He denied having used a pseudonym after entering parliament and, in 2014, threatened legal action against a constituent who had stated on Facebook that he had. In February 2015, he told LBC Radio: "I don't have a second job and have never had a second job while being an MP. End of story."

In March 2015, Shapps said he had made an error in his interview with LBC and was "mistaken over the dates" of his outside employment. He said he had "over-firmly denied" having a second job. David Cameron defended Shapps, saying he had made a mistake and it was time to "move on". In March 2015, Dean Archer, the constituent previously threatened with legal action by Shapps, threatened Shapps with legal action.

== Political career ==
After deciding to go into politics, Shapps wrote to Watford Conservative MP Tristan Garel-Jones, who invited him to the House of Commons and gave Shapps advice. Shapps made his first foray into politics in 1990, when he was a Conservative candidate for a Labour-held seat in Old Moat ward on Manchester City Council. Shapps finished in a distant second place.

In 1994, Shapps stood as a Conservative candidate for the two-member St Andrews ward in the London Borough of Brent local elections, but was unsuccessful in being returned as a councillor, with Labour narrowly holding both seats.

=== Parliamentary candidacy ===
Shapps unsuccessfully contested North Southwark and Bermondsey at the 1997 general election, finishing third with 6.9% of the vote behind the incumbent Liberal Democrat MP Simon Hughes and the Labour Party candidate.

Shapps stood for Welwyn Hatfield at the 2001 general election, finishing second with 40.4% of the vote behind the incumbent Labour MP Melanie Johnson. He was reselected to fight Welwyn Hatfield in 2002 and continued his local campaigning over the next four years.

=== Member of Parliament ===
At the 2005 general election Shapps was elected as MP for Welwyn Hatfield, winning with 49.6% and a majority of 5,946.

Shapps publicly backed David Cameron's bid for the leadership of the Conservative Party, seconding Cameron's nomination papers. Upon Cameron's election as party leader Shapps was appointed vice chairman of the Conservative Party with responsibility for campaigning.

He was a member of the Public Administration Select Committee between May 2005 and February 2007.

At the 2010 general election, Shapps was re-elected as MP for Welwyn Hatfield with an increased vote share of 57% of the vote and an increased majority of 17,423. He was again re-elected at the 2015 general election, with a decreased vote share of 50.4% and a decreased majority of 12,153.

Shapps was opposed to the UK's withdrawal from the European Union prior to the 2016 referendum and voted Remain. However, following the referendum, Shapps announced he would support the result and vote to trigger Article 50. He also called on other Remain supporting MPs to do the same, arguing that voting down Article 50 to prevent Brexit would be "creating a situation which no-one wants be it MPs, voters or business" and that Parliament would contradict the fact it had granted the public a referendum on Britain's EU membership if it was not prepared to respect the result.

Shapps was again re-elected at the snap 2017 general election, with an increased vote share of 51% and a decreased majority of 7,369.

In October 2017, Shapps called for Theresa May's resignation, saying that the party could not "bury its head in the sand" in the wake of the June election. Shapps said that 30 MPs and "one or two" Cabinet ministers agreed with him that Theresa May should resign.

At the 2019 general election, Shapps was again re-elected, with an increased vote share of 52.6% and an increased majority of 10,955.

=== Shadow housing minister ===
In June 2007, Shapps became shadow minister for housing and planning.

He was Shadow Housing Minister during the period of the last four Labour government housing ministers. During this period of opposition, he argued in favour of a community-up approach to solving the housing crisis and warned against top-down Whitehall-driven housing targets, which he believed had failed in the past.

In May 2008, Shapps was cited as one of several shadow ministers who had received cash from firms linked to their portfolios. The donors were originally recruited by Michael Gove who previously held the shadow housing portfolio. The Conservative Party said shadow ministers had not been influenced by donations. "Some Conservative policy on housing is actually against the policy of the donors", said a Conservative spokesman. Shadow ministers are allowed to receive donations from organisations covered by their brief as long as the person has a company in the UK or lives in the UK. The Commissioner exonerated all Shadow Cabinet members involved.

In April 2009, Shapps launched the Conservative Party's ninth green paper on policy, "Strong Foundations". In early 2010 Shapps published a series of six speeches in a pamphlet called "Home Truths".

=== Minister of state for housing and local government ===
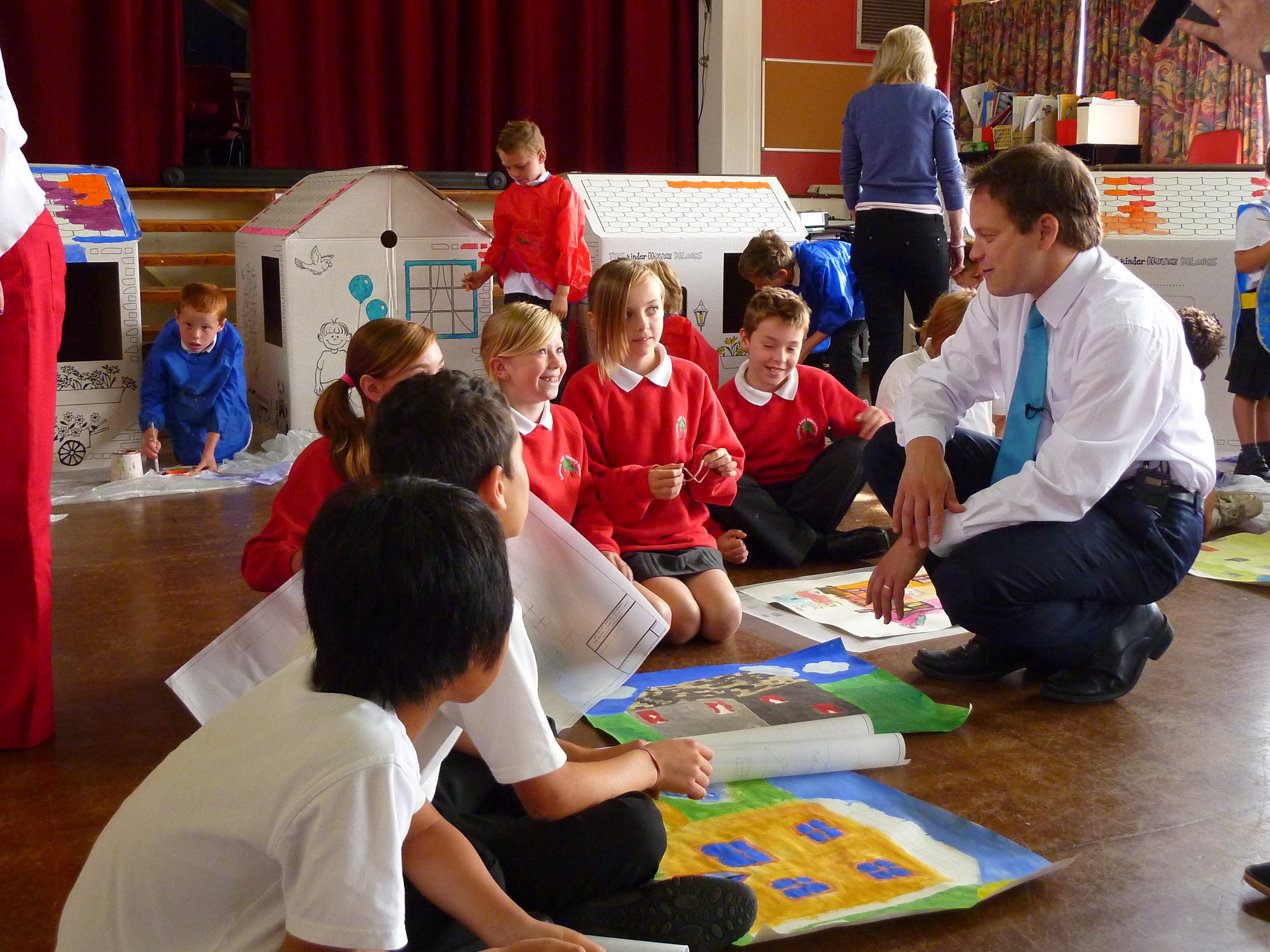
Shapps talking to primary school pupils about their visions of the future of housing in their area (July 2010)

In May 2010, after the formation of the Cameron–Clegg coalition, Shapps became minister of state for housing and local government within the Communities and Local Government department and immediately repealed Home Information Pack (HIP) legislation. He chaired the Cross-Ministerial Working Group on Homelessness, which includes ministers from eight government departments. The group introduced 'No Second Night Out', a policy designed to prevent rough sleeping nationwide.

As minister of state for housing, Shapps promoted plans for flexible rent and controversially ended automatic lifetime social tenancies. He also introduced the New Homes Bonus, which rewarded councils for building more homes. He denied claims that changes in Housing Benefit rules would be unfair claiming that ordinary people could no longer afford some of the homes paid for by the £24bn Housing Benefit bill. Shapps championed Tenant Panels.

At the 2011 party conference, Shapps backed the expansion of right to buy with the income being spent on replacing the sold housing with new affordable housing on a one-for-one basis.

In 2012, Shapps launched StreetLink – a website and phone app for the public to bring help to rough sleepers.

=== Conservative Party co-chairman ===
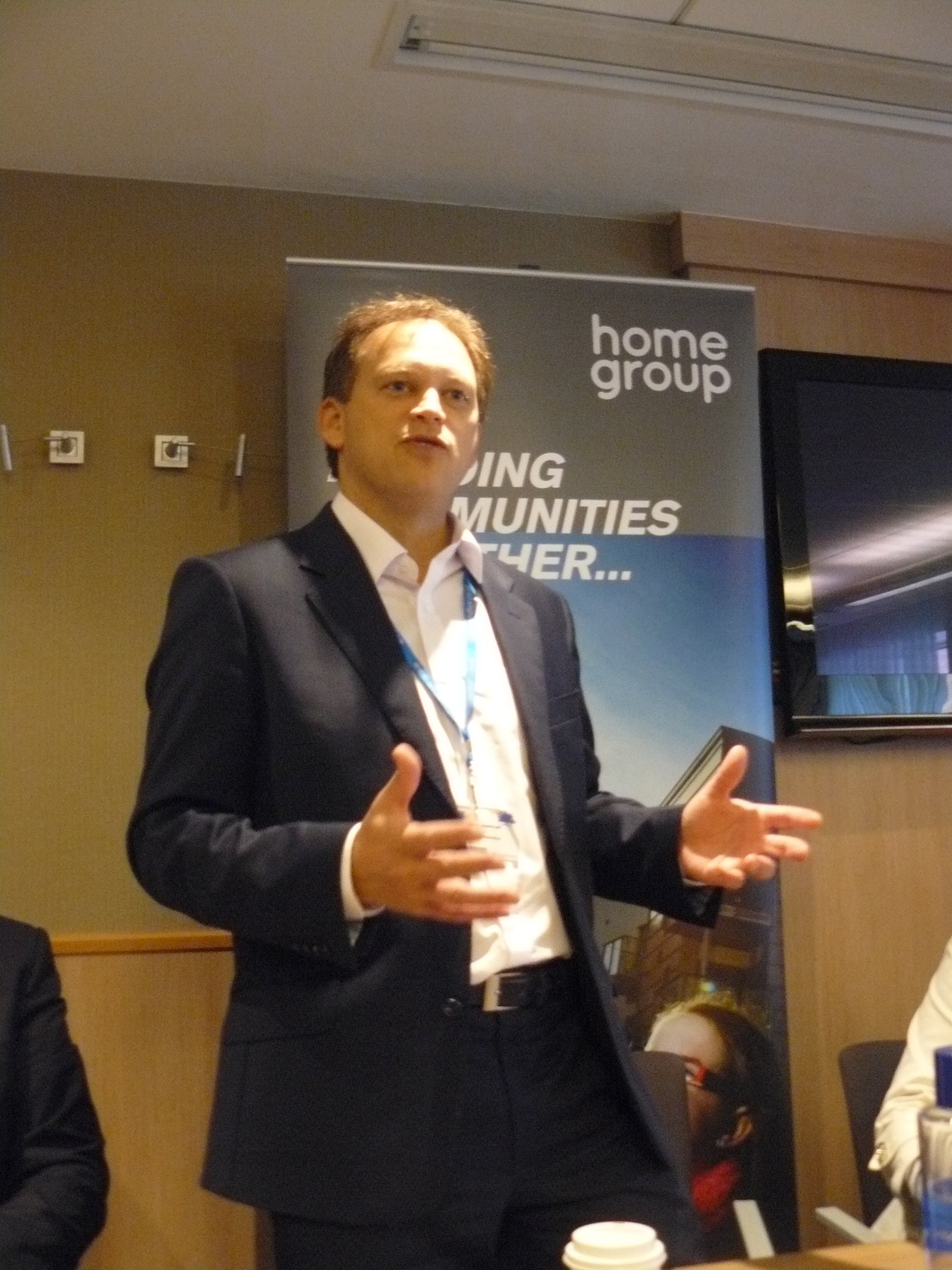
Shapps speaking at Conservative Party conference in Central Manchester during 2011

In September 2012, Shapps was appointed co-chairman of the Conservative Party in Cameron's first major reshuffle. His salary was paid by the party. That November, Shapps hired political strategist Lynton Crosby to provide strategic advice and run the 2015 election campaign, and ended his tenure after the 2015 general election.

In March 2013, Shapps defended the Welfare Reform Act 2012 (often referred to as the "Bedroom Tax") saying his own children share a bedroom. That September, Shapps complained to the secretary-general of the United Nations about a press release issued in its name stating that the reforms went against human rights. Also in 2013, Shapps speaking on benefit reforms including capping benefits so that no out-of-work household can claim more than the average working family earns said that "nearly a million people have come off incapacity benefit... before going for the test. They've taken themselves off. My big argument here is this is not these people were trying to play the system, as much as these people were forced into a system that played them." His statement was criticised by Andrew Dilnot, chairman of the UK Statistics Authority, who said that the figure for those previously on incapacity and withdrawing was just 19,700. The other 878,300 not on benefits consisted of a drop in new claimants of the ESA.

In October 2013, Shapps told The Daily Telegraph that the BBC could forfeit the right to its licence fee if it did not resolve its "culture of waste and secrecy". He also suggested that the organisation was biased against the Conservative Party, saying it did not "apply fairness in both directions" and that there was a "question of credibility for the organisation". His comments sparked a vigorous response from a former Director-General of the BBC Greg Dyke who said that "politicians shouldn't define partiality". Others, including the then Director-General of the BBC Tony Hall echoed some of Shapps's comments by saying that the "BBC needs to start treating public money as its own".

In March 2014, Shapps tweeted support of the 2014 budget as supporting ordinary people. Opponents criticised Shapps of being patronising to working people by believing their pastimes were limited to bingo and beer, and it drew critical media coverage in The Guardian.

==== Allegations regarding the editing of Wikipedia ====
In 2012, The Guardian reported that Shapps's Wikipedia article had been edited from his office to remove embarrassing information and correct an error. Shapps stated that he had edited it to make it more accurate.

During the 2015 general election campaign, The Guardian reported allegations by a Wikipedia administrator that Shapps had used a sockpuppet account, Contribsx, to remove embarrassing material from his own English Wikipedia page and make "largely unflattering" edits to articles about other politicians, including some in his own party. Shapps denied the allegations; the Daily Telegraph claimed his accuser was a "Liberal Democrat activist". English Wikipedia's Arbitration Committee found there was "no significant evidence" to link the Contribsx account to Shapps. The elected committee censured the administrator responsible for the allegation, for causing the investigation, for making false allegations to The Guardian, and for blocking the Contribsx account. Another administrator removed the block placed on the account.

=== Minister of state for international development ===
On 11 May 2015, Shapps was sacked from the Cabinet, which he had attended as Conservative Party co-chairman and minister without portfolio at the Cabinet Office, and appointed as minister of state at the Department for International Development. BBC political correspondent Chris Mason said the change appeared to be a demotion, while The Guardian's chief political correspondent, Nicholas Watt, went further, calling it "a humiliating blow".

On 28 November 2015, Shapps stood down as minister of state due to allegations of bullying within the Conservative Party. It has been claimed that Shapps, in his previous role as party co-chairman, had ignored repeated allegations of bullying involving Mark Clarke, the then party youth organiser. Baroness Warsi, Shapps's predecessor as co-chair of the Conservative Party, had written to Shapps to raise concerns about Clarke's conduct in January 2015. Shapps had appointed Clarke to head his party's RoadTrip 2015 campaign in January 2015. Clarke denies all allegations. The alleged bullying may have caused a young party member, Elliott Johnson, to commit suicide. The day before Shapps's resignation, Johnson's father had called on Shapps to step down and made the following comments:

Feldman, Shapps and whoever else is involved in this – clearly these senior members of the party have been telling lies ... If they had behaved responsibly ... none of these events would have happened; my son would still be alive and many activists wouldn't have been intimidated and harassed.

=== OpenBrix allegations ===
In August 2018, the Financial Times reported that it had discovered a "secret pay deal" between Shapps and OpenBrix, a British blockchain property portal company. The story alleged that Shapps would have received payment in cryptocurrency tokens with a future value of up to £700,000. Shapps resigned from OpenBrix and from his position as chairman of the all-party parliamentary group on blockchain which he had founded. Subsequently, Jo Platt, an opposition politician, called for an enquiry into Shapps's conduct, although Shapps maintained that he had confirmed with the standards commissioner that he was not required to register the interest, and that he had recorded the conversation with the relevant official.

=== Secretary of state for transport ===
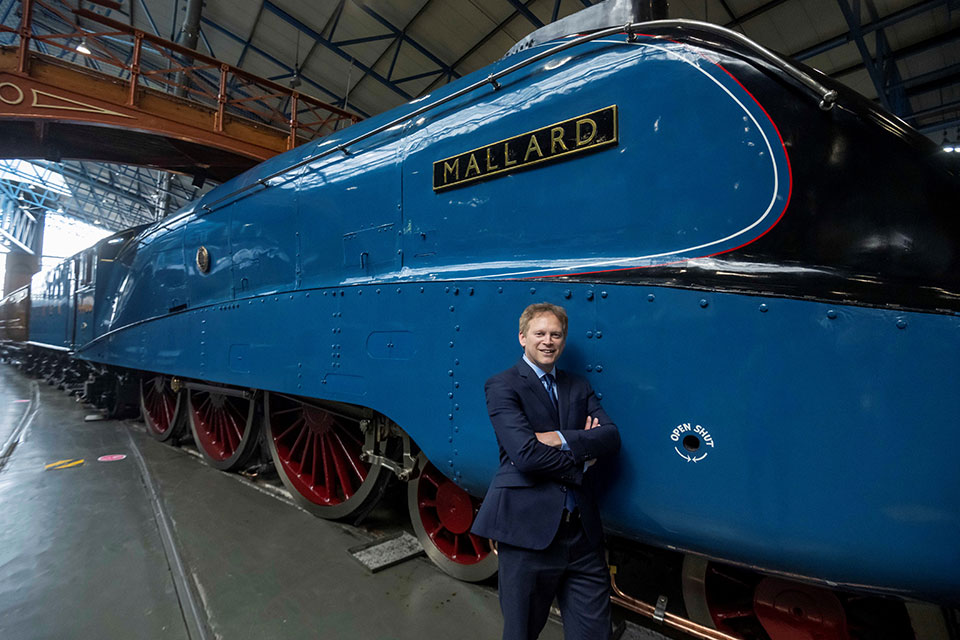
Grant Shapps in front of A4 Mallard in National Railway Museum, announcing the formation of Great British Railways

Boris Johnson appointed Shapps Secretary of State for Transport upon his accession to Prime Minister. In the February 2020 cabinet reshuffle he retained this portfolio. He was given Cabinet responsibility for the Northern Powerhouse.

In May 2020, the Secretary of State for Transport announced the Active Travel Fund, which included funding allocations for emergency active travel schemes for local authorities.

==== Thomas Cook collapse ====
On 23 September 2019, Thomas Cook Group fell into administration, leaving more than 150,000 British tourists in need of repatriation. When asked why the Government chose not to bail out the company, Shapps said, "I fear it would have kept them afloat for a very short period of time and then we would have been back in the position of needing to repatriate people in any case."

==== General aviation ====
In October 2019, Shapps, a keen pilot, wrote to the Civil Aviation Authority (CAA), urging it to prioritise the protection of aerodromes and cut red tape for pilots. He was accused by Andy McDonald MP, Shadow Transport Secretary, of "putting his hobbyhorse aviation ahead of the greater good" at a time when the CAA was involved in Brexit planning, Heathrow Airport expansion, and dealing with the collapse of Thomas Cook Group. He was later accused by MPs Sarah Olney (Liberal Democrat) and Grahame Morris (Labour) of undermining the CAA by registering his private, UK-based plane in the USA instead of the UK, while Transport Secretary.

In 2021, The Times reported that the Airfield Advisory Team set up by Shapps within CAA lobbied against the redevelopment of private airfields used by general aviation. The newspaper alleged that the team interferes with the government housing plans. He also set up a scheme, offering rebates to pilots who purchase anti-collision "electronic conspicuity" devices used to detect positions of other aircraft in the air.

==== Cycling ====
In May 2020, Shapps unveiled investment in cycle lanes totalling £250 million and plans for e-scooters to be trialled on British roads.

==== Railway announcements controversy ====
In January 2022, Shapps collaborated with voice-over and social media personality Seb Sargent as part of a Department for Transport pledge to reduce unnecessary train announcements on trains, which was criticised for being similar to "a parody."

=== July 2022 leadership bid ===
Logo for Shapps's leadership bid

Shapps announced his campaign for leadership of the Conservative Party, following the resignation of Boris Johnson, on 9 July 2022. He withdrew from the race on 12 July, endorsing Rishi Sunak for leader.

=== Home secretary ===
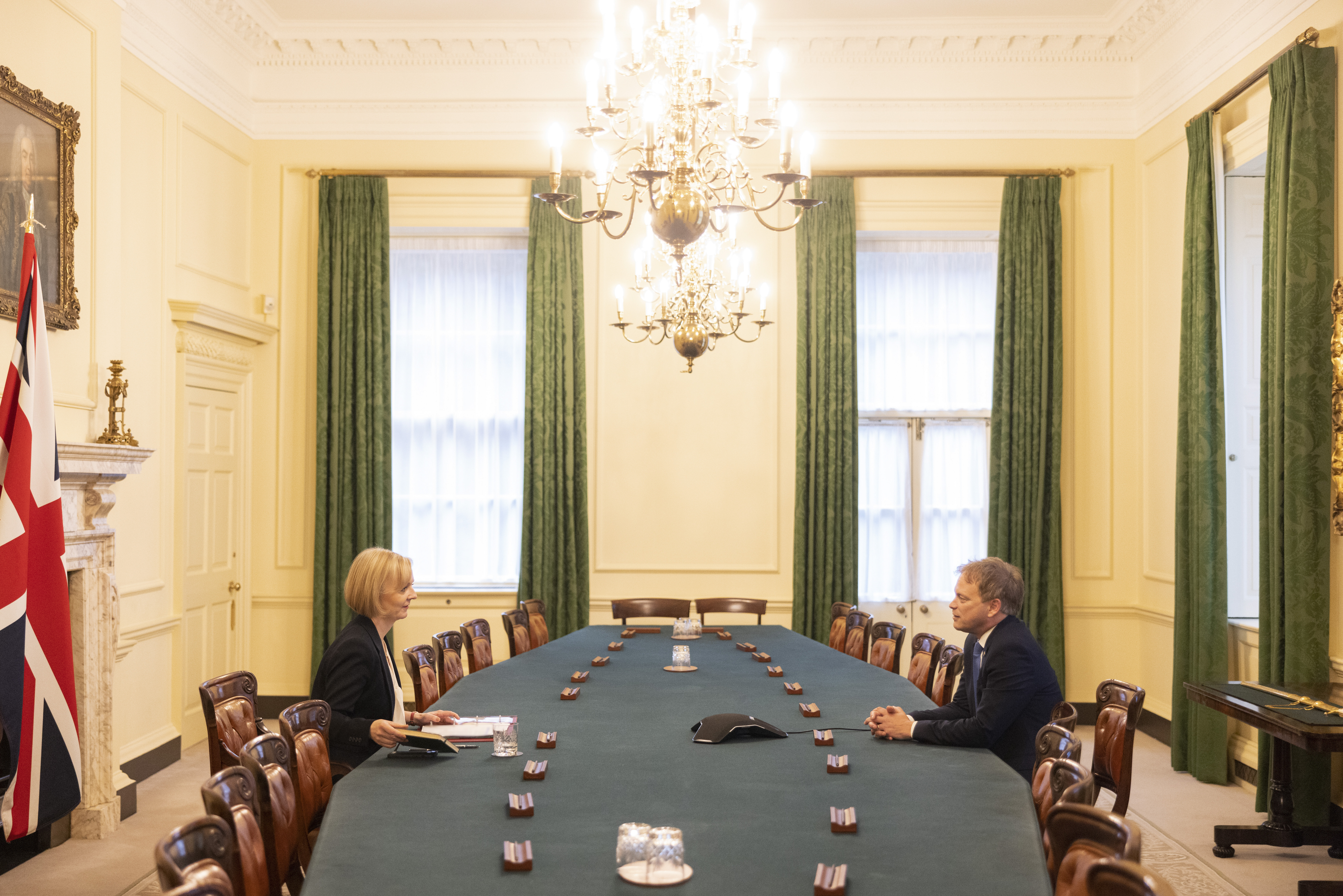
Shapps meeting with Prime Minister Liz Truss following his appointment as Home Secretary, October 2022

Shapps was appointed home secretary on 19 October 2022 following the resignation of Suella Braverman. This occurred one day before Prime Minister Liz Truss announced her own resignation. Shapps tenure as home secretary was only 6 days long before resigning on 25 October 2022 to become Business secretary.

=== Business secretary ===
Shapps was appointed business secretary on 25 October 2022 by Rishi Sunak after the resignation of former business secretary Jacob Rees-Mogg while Suella Braverman returned to the position of Home Secretary.

=== Energy secretary ===
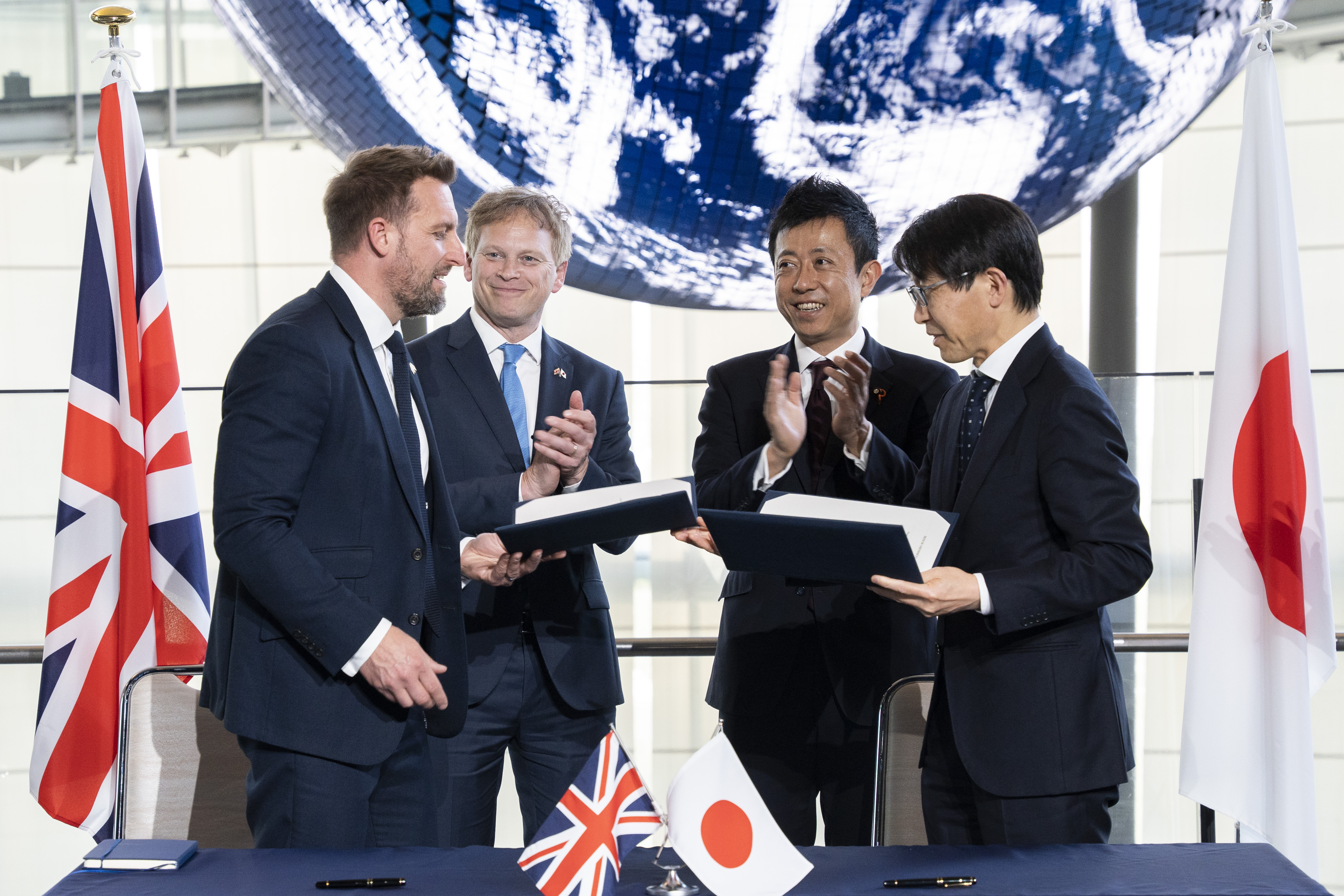
Shapps at the Miraikan Science Museum in Tokyo as Energy Secretary, 2023

Following a cabinet reshuffle, Shapps was moved into the newly created portfolio of Secretary of State for Energy Security and Net Zero. Shapps's newly formed ministry had been formed from responsibilities taken from his previous role. He was the first holder of the role of Energy Secretary since Amber Rudd in 2016.

=== Defence secretary ===
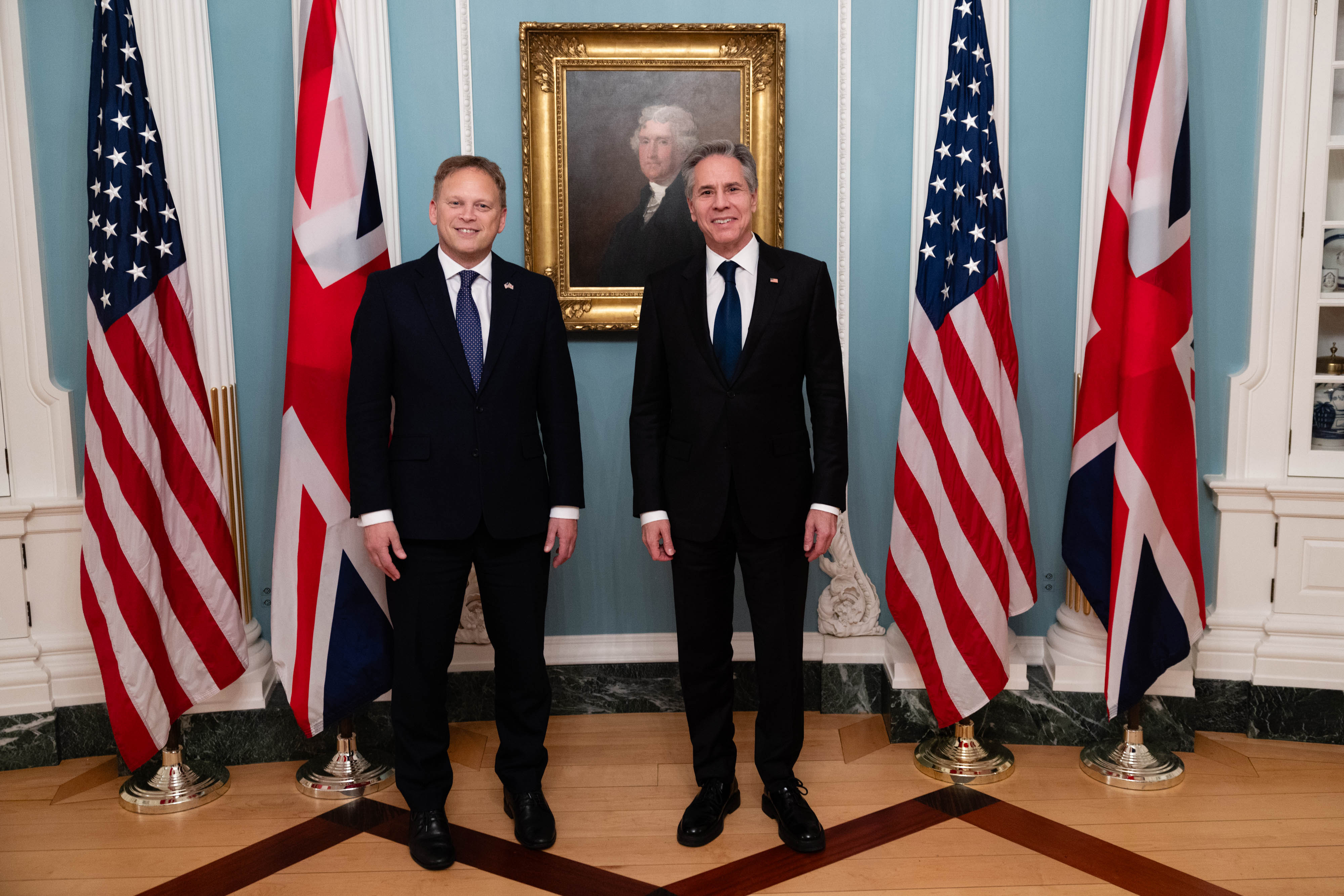
Shapps with United States Secretary of State Antony Blinken, January 2024

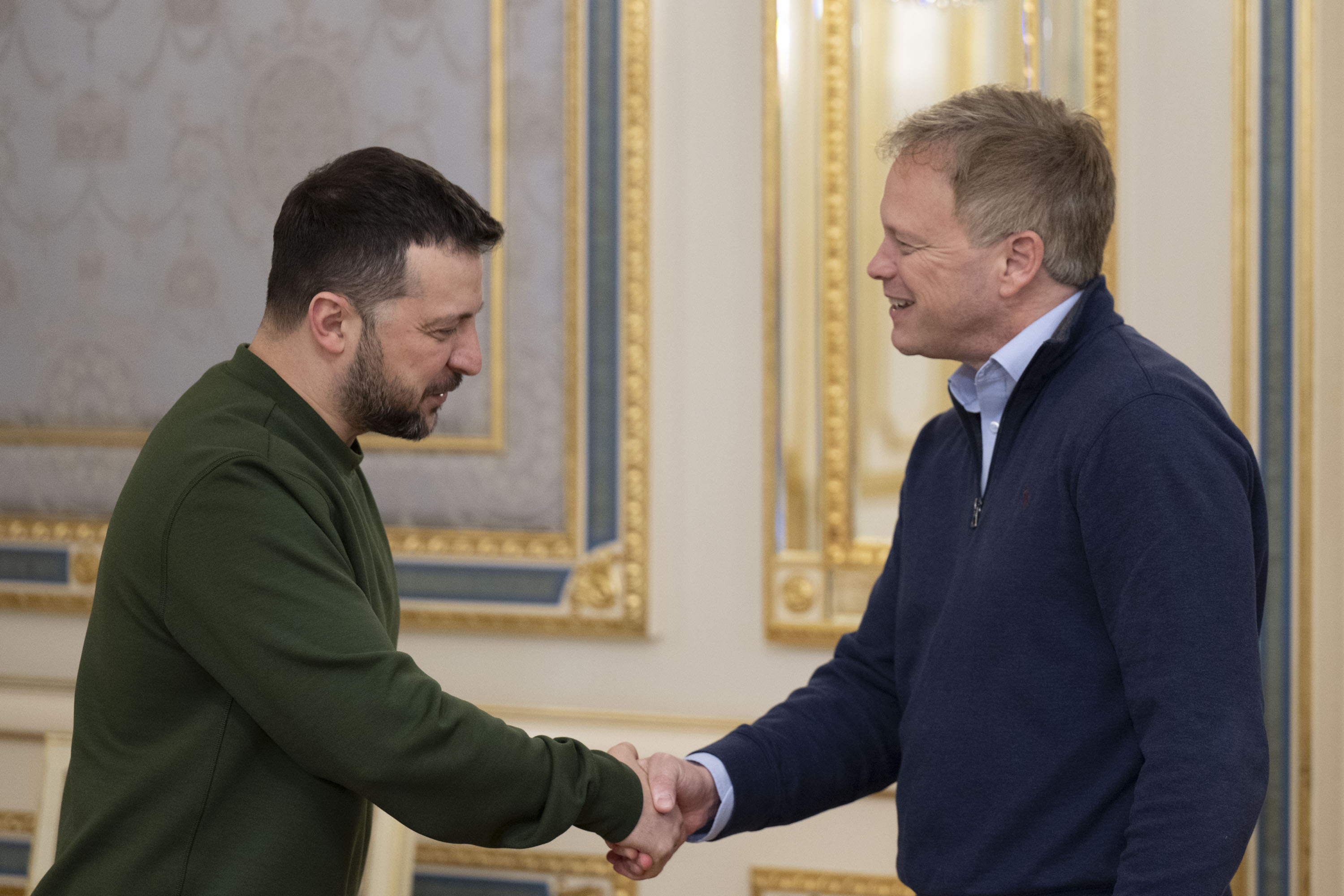
Shapps with Ukrainian President Volodymyr Zelenskyy, March 2024

On 31 August 2023, Shapps was appointed Secretary of State for Defence, replacing Ben Wallace.

In December, he warned that Europe had to look out for their own security, citing how the US support for Ukraine has recently been waning. He also announced details of a new Maritime Capability Coalition for Ukraine, alongside his Norwegian counterpart, Bjørn Arild Gram, which their respective countries are leading.

In July 2025, Shapps defended the use of an unprecedented superinjunction to suppress a data breach that led to the UK government relocating 15,000 Afghans, and argued he was right to support its maintenance during his time at the MoD.

== Post-parliamentary career ==
Following his defeat at the 2024 UK General Election, Shapps has served as Co-chairman of Conservatives Together, organisation to support Conservative activists.

On 30 April 2026, Shapps resigned as chairman of Cambridge Aerospace over concerns he broke the rules governing the employment of former ministers. The firm had recently secured a multimillion-pound government missile contract.

In July 2026, he was reported to have been blocked from restanding as a Conservative MP under the leadership of Kemi Badenoch.

== Personal life ==
Shapps married Belinda Goldstone in 1997. The couple have three children. In 1999, Shapps was diagnosed with Hodgkin's lymphoma and underwent chemotherapy and radiotherapy, recovering from the cancer by the following year. After the successful chemotherapy, his children were conceived by IVF.

The recreation he names in Who's Who as being a "private pilot with IMC [Instrument Meteorological Conditions] and night qualifications".

Shapps is Jewish: in a 2010 interview with The Jewish Chronicle, he stated that he follows Jewish traditions but personally considers himself to be an agnostic and an indifferentist.

== Honours ==
Shapps was sworn into the Privy Council on 21 July 2010 at Buckingham Palace, giving him the honorific title "The Right Honourable" for life. In April 2025, Shapps was knighted in the 2024 Prime Minister's Resignation Honours by Rishi Sunak "for political and public service".

== Notes ==
Parliament of the United Kingdom
Preceded by Melanie Johnson	Member of Parliament for Welwyn Hatfield; 2005–2024	Succeeded by Andrew Lewin
Political offices
Preceded by Michael Gove	Shadow Minister for Housing and Planning; 2007–2010	Succeeded by John Healey as Shadow Minister for Housing
Preceded by John Healey; As Minister of State for Housing; Rosie Winterton; As Minister of State for Local Government	Minister of State for Housing and Local Government; 2010–2012	Succeeded by Mark Prisk
Preceded by The Baroness Warsi	Minister without portfolio 2012–2015	Succeeded by Robert Halfon
Preceded by Desmond Swayne	Minister of State for International Development; 2015	Succeeded by Nick Hurd as Parliamentary Under-Secretary of State for International Development
Preceded by Chris Grayling	Secretary of State for Transport; 2019–2022	Succeeded by Anne-Marie Trevelyan
Preceded by Suella Braverman	Home Secretary; 2022	Succeeded by Suella Braverman
Preceded by Jacob Rees-Mogg	Secretary of State for Business, Energy and Industrial Strategy; 2022–2023	Succeeded by Kemi Badenoch
Vacant Title last held by Amber Rudd as Secretary of State for Energy and Climate Change	Secretary of State for Energy Security and Net Zero; 2023	Succeeded by Claire Coutinho
Preceded by Ben Wallace	Secretary of State for Defence; 2023–2024	Succeeded by John Healey
Party political offices
Preceded by The Baroness Warsi	Chairman of the Conservative Party; 2012–2015; With: The Lord Feldman of Elstree	Succeeded by The Lord Feldman of Elstree
