= Tenant Panel =

Proposed British organisation

A Tenant Panel is an organisation proposed by the British Coalition government to facilitate local residents exercising control over their environment.

Residents, including social housing tenants, want to make big positive differences to their communities – and I want to put the powers in their hands to be able to do so. For too long, when there’s a problem in their area, they have been told to sit tight and wait until action is taken on their behalf. The new powers and skills that tenant panels will bring will instead allow them to take control of their area; putting them at the heart of proposing solutions, and no longer simply putting up with the problems.

— Grant Shapps, Inside Housing

Grant Shapps, the UK Housing Minister has engaged the National Tenant Organisation - a consortium of the Confederation of Co-operative Housing, the Tenant Participation Advisory Service, the National Federation of Tenant Management Organisations and the Tenants’ and Residents’ Organisations of England - to develop a framework for these panels.
