= UK and Ireland BBYO =

Jewish teen organisation

BBYO UK & Ireland
- Purpose: Youth group
- Headquarters: London
- Region served: UK and Ireland
- Official language: English
- Staff: 3
- Website: BBYO UK & Ireland

BBYO UK & Ireland is a part of BBYO, a peer-led, Zionist youth movement. It is open to Jewish youth between the ages of 13 and 18 who want to take part in its activities. The members form local chapters, of which 3 are situated in the United Kingdom and Ireland, formerly BBYO District 15. The members are encouraged to play an active role in both the Jewish and general community. Globally BBYO reaches over 80,000 Jewish teens. However, as of Veida 2023, BBYO UK & BBYO Ireland have split into two distinct regions.

== History ==
In 1923, a group of Jewish boys in Omaha, Nebraska organised their own fraternity after they had been refused entry to local fraternities that often excluded Jews. After a few months, a second chapter was founded in Kansas City. Thanks to the vision of adviser Sam Beber, who dreamt of a global Jewish movement, on May 3, 1924, a meeting took place and the Grand Order of the Aleph Zadik Aleph was born. The organisation rapidly began to grow and by April 1925 there were 7 chapters. Sam Beber approached the B'nai B'rith National Convention for support and AZA was adopted as the B'nai B'rith primary youth programme. At the same time, small sororities began to spring up across North America, some using the B'nai B'rith Girls name. It was not until 1944 that, under the leadership of Anita Perlman, BBG was officially established as an international Order, and recognised by B'nai B'rith. The B'nai B'rith Youth Organisation was officially born.

In March 1940, Louis E Wigoder, an American living in Leeds founded Pioneer AZA #481, BBYO's first chapter in the United Kingdom. In June 1940, a similar story unfolded in Ireland, as an AZA chapter was founded in Dublin by American M. Gordon. In October 1943, Centenary AZA was established in Birmingham thanks to the hard work of American soldier Private William Katz and by 1944, further AZA chapters had been established in London. 1944 was also an important year for BBG as its first chapters opened in Leeds and Birmingham. By 1949, more chapters had been founded.

BBYO was now big enough in the UK and Ireland to hold its first ever National Convention, in Hull. Hans Blanc was elected to lead the first National Executive, as the first National President, of BBYO District 15. BBYO District 15 continued to grow and sent its first members to AZA and BBG International Conventions, in 1955 and 1956 respectively.

By 1966, the AZA and BBG chapters had become joint BBYO chapters and BBYO District 15 had grown enough to need an office and its first ever member of staff. Janet Ross worked as BBYO's first National Director from Hillel House in London. In 1973, members from London, Hull, Manchester, Coventry and Nottingham chapters took part in BBYO's first ever Israel tour. In 1981, Steven Kron, from Dublin, became the first BBYO member from the UK & Ireland to hold a position on the International Board, as the Grand Aleph Shaliach.

In the 1990s, BBYO began to become more independent from B'nai B'rith. In 1997, BBYO officially became a Zionist movement, passing a motion at National Convention, and the ideologies took the format that we know today. In 2002, BBYO in North America became independent from B'nai B'rith and reformed as BBYO, Inc. Over the course of the next decade, BBYO District 15 became known as BBYO UK & Ireland, in line with BBYO across the rest of the world. 2002 also saw the first summer camp take place in the UK and in 2003, it was given the Hebrew name Shorashim, meaning 'roots'. In 2008, after over 40 years at Hillel House BBYO moved into its own office in Hendon. In 2014, BBYO UK & Ireland signed a historic partnership agreement with BBYO Inc formalising their partnership and cementing their place as part of the global BBYO family.

== Operation ==
The whole district of UK & Ireland is led by the National Executive (team of six) which is elected by the members at an annual event called National Veida. The National Executive is made up of people usually aged 15–17. The National Executive supports the chapters as well as runs national events for the members.

BBYO UKI also has an Executive Director, a Head of Programmes, and a Programme Coordinator who make up the professional team to support the National Exec. BBYO "elders" (bogrim) make up the Youth Commission and they support the chapters and the National Exec in an advisory role.

BBYO runs a number of events national events through the year. A national event means that it is open to all chapters.

== Chapters ==
The chapters typically hold their meetings every Sunday in the evening. The chapters have their own individual identity; the activities and programmes vary between chapters.

The four active chapters in the United Kingdom and Ireland are (as of 2026): Borehamwood (Kehilah), Mill Hill (Deganya), North London (Mercaz), South Manchester (Weizmann), Bristol (Ro'esh).

The following chapters are inactive: Barnet (Masada, inactive in 2017), Birmingham, Bournemouth, Bushey (Sababa, inactive in 2018, formerly located in and called Pinner), Nottingham (Yoni, inactive in 2017), and Watford (Gesher, inactive in 2022).

== Chapter Executive Board Positions ==
In the UK and Ireland each chapter has up to six board members. These are the members that are in charge of running the programmes and looking after all the other members in that chapter. As BBYO is peer-led the positions are taken up by the older members of the group, usually aged between 15 and 17. There is also a national executive board, and the national president is in charge of the presidents of the different chapters. The next national executive board is voted in halfway through the current national executive's terms at National Veida.

There are six positions with different jobs to do:

Position	Job	National executive board	Deganya executive board	Kehilah executive board	Mercaz executive board	Weizmann Executive board	Ro'esh Executive Board
President	Ensures that the executive work together as a team to fulfil their aims and further their chapter and their movement.	Evie Lightman and Evie Baderman	Evie Lightman	Josie Brattman	Abigail	Daniel Leshem	Zippy
Vice-president	The Vice's job is recruitment, retention (via hosting members), and social media. They coordinate and enacts grassroots membership campaigns for their chapter and their movement. Develops recruitment strategies for events.	Noa Hammerman	Evie Baderman	Noa Hammerman	Eleanor Krushner	Nate Leinhardt	N/A
Admin & Finance	The administrator's role is focused around organisation. They strengthen the branding of BBYO through merchandising and advertising, while organising events to attract members. The administrator makes sure security is organised throughout the year, creates chapter merchandise, organises locations, keeps proper records of members, chapter meetings and executive meetings creates budgets and is in charge of overall treasury.	Lexi Sidney	Lexi Sidney	N/A	Leo Coen	Zak Cousen	Johnny
Programmer	Works with members to ensure a high quality of programming every week. Ensures that all programmes are submitted to the Nation Program Bank.	Ariella Hutchinson	Fraser Margolin	Amelie	Noa Ebell	Josh Glynne	Manny
Jewish and Zionism Awareness Officer	Ensures that all members are informed and updated on matters of Judaism and Israel through the use of programs, events and resources.	Tamara Leslie	Tamara Leslie	Nathan Montefiore	Poppy	N/A	Ben
Social Action and Causes Officer	Facilitates activism and social action. Ensures that their chapter and their movement play an active role in Mitzvah Day and J-Serve.	Nathan Montefiore	Daniel Seaton	Rafi Mellish	Poppy	Giselle Cowan	Eyal

== Events ==
Event name	Date
Chapter elections	September
Kick Off	September
Chapter Leadership Training Course (CLTC)	October
Mitzvah Day	November
Fall Fest [Not running as of 2019]	November
Back 2 BBYO (Sixth form Shabbaton) [Not running as of 2019]	November
Global Shabbat	December
Winter Convention (Machane Choref)	December
Spring Kick Off (formally District Chapters' Ball)	January
Chapter Development Day	January
Beginnings and Belong (New Members Weekend) [Not running as of 2019]	February
National Veida	April
J-Serve	April
2nd Chapter Leadership Training Course [Not running as of 2019]	April
Founders' Day	June
Israel Tour (for Year 11s post-GCSE)	July–August
Me'ir Israel (Second timers visit to Israel) [Not running as of 2019]	August
Shorashim (Summer camp)	July - August
NETC (formally District Leadership Training Course)	August
